= Madinat al-Zahira =

Fortified palace-city in Córdoba, Spain

Madinat al-Zâhira مدينة الزاهرة
- Fortified palace-city
- Approximate location in Spain
- Coordinates: 37.8772°N 4.7425°W
- Country: Al-Andalus (historical)
- Region: Caliphate of Córdoba
- Founded: c. 975
- Destroyed: 1011
- Founder: Almanzor

Population
  - Total: Unknown
- Precise location unconfirmed

Madinat al-Zâhira (English: "The resplendent city") was the fortified palace-city and residence of Almanzor, the vizier of Hisham II, and his sons, who effectively ruled the Caliphate of Córdoba from 978 to 1009.

Constructed to the east of Córdoba, the city was intended to rival and undermine the authority of the caliph by competing with Madinat al-Zahra, the caliph's palatine city to the west. Fortified to withstand potential uprisings or attacks from the caliph, Madinat al-Zâhira was established around 975 and foreshadowed the Andalusian civil war, which led to its destruction in 1011 and contributed to the collapse of the caliphate in 1031. Despite extensive historical references, the precise location of the city remains undiscovered, though credible hypotheses have emerged.

== Sources ==
Madinat al-Zâhira is documented in historical texts, notably in Al-Bayan by Ibn Idhari. Additional details are scattered throughout the works of other authors, such as Al-Ramadi and Ibn Hazm in his treatise The Ring of the Dove.

== Foundation ==
Upon assuming power in the name of Caliph Hisham II in 978, Almanzor initiated the construction of a grand palace east of Córdoba along the Guadalquivir River. His aim was threefold: to showcase his magnificence, ensure his security, and position himself as a rival to the caliph. Tradition holds that the lavish construction progressed rapidly, and by 981, Almanzor had taken up residence. The city’s name and location deliberately mirrored Madinat al-Zahra, the caliphal residence west of Córdoba. These dates align with traditional accounts, primarily from the Andalusian chronicler and poet Al-Fath ibn Khaqan, echoed by later medieval writers. However, modern scholarship suggests Almanzor may have repurposed pre-existing structures rather than building anew.

As Almanzor consolidated power over the caliph, he urgently constructed a fortified palace to counter the risk of confrontation. According to legend, the site was chosen based on an omen prophesying that a city built there would become the center of power but ultimately doom the Umayyad dynasty. Historian Laura Bariani describes the palace as heavily fortified, with key administrative buildings intentionally placed outside the walls, which enclosed Almanzor, his retinue, and his troops. The fortress was relatively small, characterized as "a true stronghold with towers and lookout points," accessible only via a gate opposite Córdoba to enhance its aura of invincibility. Like other defensive structures of the era, it likely featured a single eastern entrance, dubbed the "Gate of Victory," where Almanzor reportedly displayed the severed head of Galib—a general who allied with Castilians and Navarrese to curb Almanzor’s authoritarian drift.

Madinat al-Zâhira also served as a stage to impress foreign dignitaries, who were received there instead of the caliphal palaces. Near the gate stood a mosque, which Almanzor unsuccessfully sought to establish as Córdoba’s principal mosque in 981. Later chronicles describe the city as surpassing Madinat al-Zahra in refinement and opulence, adorned with "columns as transparent as water and slender as the necks of maidens, white marble seats gleaming like scented camphor, and basins with lion-shaped fountains."

== Population ==
Almanzor initially relocated his family—wives, children, and close relatives—along with their servants. The site also housed numerous workers, artisans, and artists who continued to enhance it. As the chamberlain sought to make the city his power base, civil and religious officials settled nearby, drawn by property privileges. Given its fortified nature, a significant military presence was maintained. Merchants, lured by the wealth, established bustling bazaars around the residence, which also attracted poets in droves.

== Destruction ==
While the caliphs ruled from Córdoba, Almanzor’s sons governed as emirs from Madinat al-Zâhira, forming a rival dynasty. The Umayyads recognized that reclaiming power required dismantling this symbolic stronghold. According to a later chronicle, on February 15, 1009, Muhammad al-Mahdi ordered the city’s destruction, commanding his forces to "raze the city, topple its walls, tear down its gates, dismantle its palaces, and erase all traces." Córdoba’s populace stormed the city, looting all movable goods while buildings, monuments, fountains, and ramparts were systematically demolished. The goal was to obliterate any remnant of the short-lived Amirid dynasty; the site was leveled and abandoned, signaling the onset of the civil war in al-Andalus (1011–1031).

Arab chroniclers recount a three-day plunder yielding a staggering haul: 1,500,000 gold coins and 2,100,000 silver pieces. On February 19, 1009, the caliph ordered the ruins torched. However, Ibn Hayyan notes that in 1023, a prefect occupied Madinat al-Zâhira, suggesting a slower decline during the civil war rather than immediate annihilation. Like its counterpart Madinat al-Zahra, it likely suffered systematic looting by subsequent regimes.

== Survival ==
Beyond the citadel itself, Madinat al-Zâhira included a perimeter wall and a mosque. Like Madinat al-Zahra, it spurred the development of significant suburbs, linking Córdoba to each palatine city. The western districts (toward Madinat al-Zahra) vanished between the 11th and 12th centuries amid depopulation, likely exacerbated by the Almohad conquest of Córdoba in 1162, which destroyed remnants of Madinat al-Zahra.

Eastern suburbs persisted longer. The mosque of Madinat al-Zâhira, a direct legacy of Almanzor’s reign, remained intact during Almohad rule. The Andalusian poet Ibn al-Abbar records that the Sufi Abu al-Qasim, who died in 1182, preached there in a still-inhabited quarter.

== Location ==
Proposed locations of Medina Alzahira:

1. 1772: Huerto del Rey, Hospital del Cardenal, and San Bartolomé church (historic center sector).
2. 1837, 1884: Heras de la Salud and Huertas del Rey (former royal vegetable gardens).
3. 1905, 1917: Hermitage of Fuensanta, Pólvora plateau, and the Santiago neighborhood.
4. 1910: Ruins of Moroquil and Alamiriya (Caliphal-era remains).
5. 1912: Cortijo del Alcaide ("Alcaide" agricultural estate).
6. 1912: Vado de Casillas (former ford on the river).
7. 1924, 1929: Cañito de María Ruiz (area of a small spring or fountain).
8. 1957: Fuensanta Church and its adjacent market garden area.
9. 1964: Hazas de Lope García (arable land parcels near the river).
10. 1964: Cortijo del Arenal (agricultural estate in the alluvial "El Arenal" neighborhood).
11. 1964: Between the Pedroches and Rabanales streams (arroyos).
12. 1964: Pago de Valdetejas or Tejavana (agricultural land or named place).
13. 1994: Las Quemadas estate and the plains of Las Quemadillas (slash-and-burn areas or arid lands).
14. 2010: Between the Lope García mill and the Carbonell mill (medieval industrial sector on the Guadalquivir river).
15. 2011: Opposite the Mercacórdoba logistics center, between the highway and the river.
16. 2013: Between the El Arenal estate and the Carbonell mill.
17. 2014: Between the Pedroche stream and the El Arenal estate.
18. 2014: Cortijo de las Quemadillas (agricultural estate).
19. 2014: In the center of the river's second meander, on the bank.
20. 2014: South of the Las Quemadas path, near the Palomarejo estate.
21. 2018: Between the Lope García mill and the Carbonell mill, centered on the Rafael Gómez gymnasium.

Efforts to locate Madinat al-Zâhira date back to Sánchez de Feria in 1772, with modern research guided by historical clues. At least 21 potential sites have been rigorously studied, though scientific methods prevailed only after the 1950s. Early excavations, such as those uncovering Munyat al-Rummaniya in 1910 and a major campaign in 1963, preceded more recent focus in the 2010s–2020s on two zones: a Guadalquivir meander east of Córdoba and a further eastern site on an ancient river bend.

The city was built east of Córdoba along the Guadalquivir, designed with a single eastern gate to force attackers to circumnavigate its walls. The nearest Córdoba gate was Las Trabas (Bab al-Sikal), and the city occupied a promontory overlooking the landscape. Almanzor argued that its mosque’s distance from Córdoba’s main mosque—estimated at one parasang (a Persian unit of 5.6 km)—justified its status for the tagmī prayer. Poetic and political texts from the period describe a route involving multiple paths and bridges, suggesting a southeastern location where Guadalquivir tributaries flow. However, the river’s shifting course over centuries complicates pinpointing the site, especially in the marshy southeast.

No official excavations have occurred since the 1970s, though hypotheses center on coordinates 37.875806°N 4.740361°W and 37.878583°N 4.744694°W, spanning a 300 m² area where high-quality caliphal artifacts, preserved in Córdoba’s museum, were found. This site, serviced by numerous contemporary roads and featuring three bridge remnants, lies on a hill visible from Madinat al-Zahra, aligning with Córdoba’s mosque and Medina. Other proposed locations include the Las Quemadas industrial park, where Caliphal-era materials were unearthed but attributed by some to Visigothic fortifications; this site was concreted over in 1974. (Note: What's more, these locations are on a knoll visible from Medinat al Zahra, and the axis it forms with Medinat Alzahra passes through the Cordoba Mosque in the city of Medina.)

The only confirmed artifact from Madinat al-Zâhira is a broken marble ablution basin, discovered in Seville and displayed in Madrid’s Archaeological Museum. Inscribed with a text dated 987–988, it was commissioned by Almanzor for the palace. A second white marble ablution basin in Marrakech, from the Caliphal period, is strongly linked to Abd al-Malik al-Muzaffar, Almanzor’s son and vizier (991–1008), bearing an inscription from around 912–913 CE.

Despite its pivotal role in Al-Andalus' history—disrupting the established order and sparking the civil war that toppled the caliphate—concrete evidence remains elusive, leaving Madinat al-Zâhira an enigmatic abstraction.

A recent research consisting of the LiDAR-based analysis of land anomalies resulted in a tentative proposal placing the former city in La Pendolilla estate, located 12 km to the east of the Aljama and the fortresses of Madinat Qurtuba, near the discharge of the Guadalmellato into the Guadalquivir, not far from Alcolea.

== See also ==
- Moorish architecture
- Umayyad Caliphate
- Taifas
