= Statue of Almanzor, Algeciras =

2002 statue in Spain

Statue of Almanzor in Algeciras
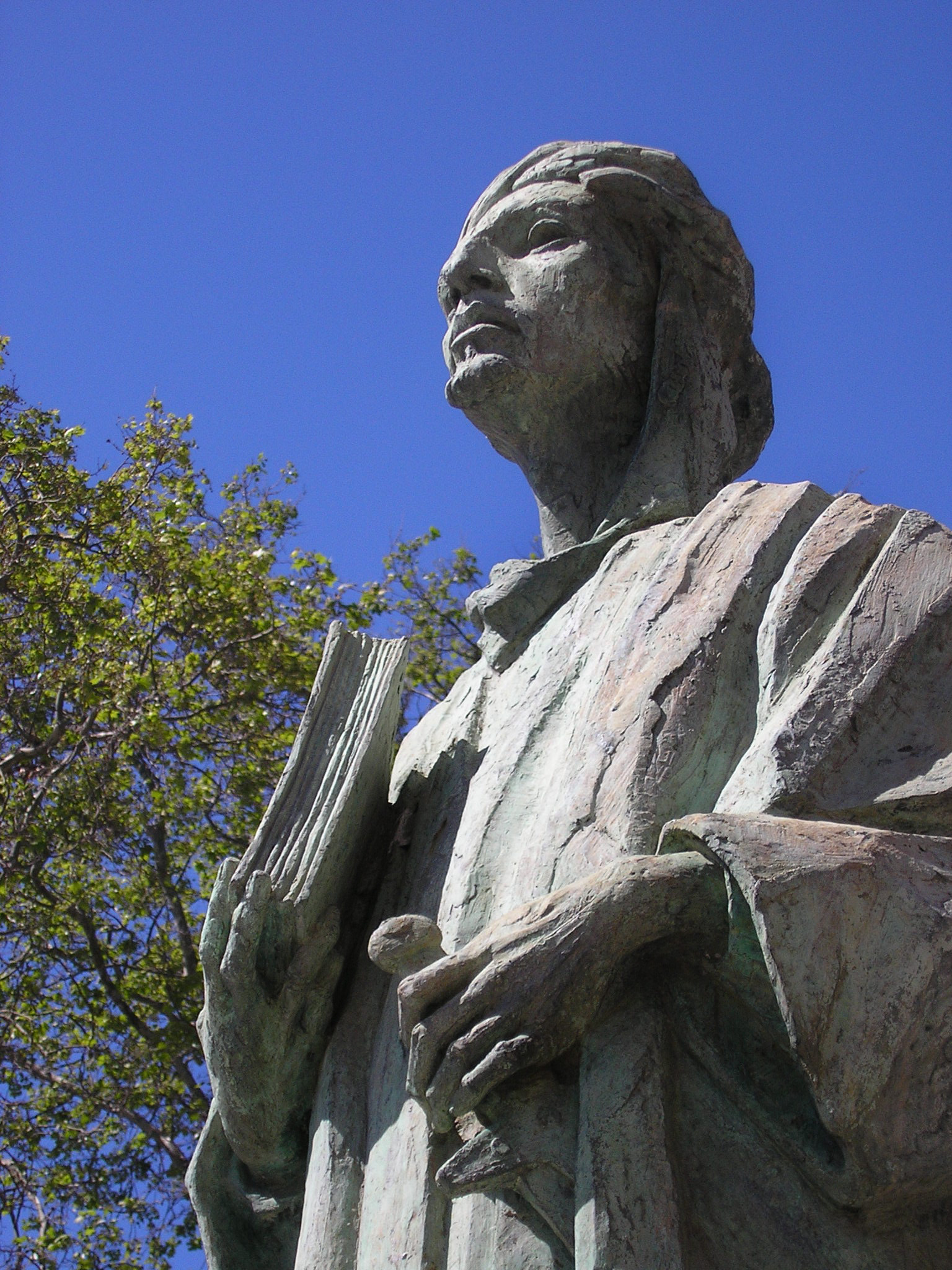
- The statue in April 2009
- Artist: Mariano Roldán
- Year: 2002
- Medium: Bronze
- Location: Algeciras, Andalusia, Spain

The Statue of Almanzor is a 2002 statue depicting the medieval Islamic Spanish ruler Almanzor. It originally sat in what are now believed to be Christian ruins in the southern Spanish city of Algeciras. It was removed in 2013 and has yet to be reinstalled.

== Design ==
The statue was the winning design in a competition. It is a modernist style statue made of bronze, and depicts Almanzor with a Quran in his right hand and a sword in the left.

Alberto Pérez de Vargas, a professor at Complutense University, said that "it would be difficult to find a qualifier that has not been applied to [Almanzor]; from 'Islam's El Cid' to 'The Beast', going through everything imaginable for good or evil". He organised raids against the Christian states of northern Spain, where his armies destroyed cities and took slaves.

== History ==
The statue was erected in Algeciras, Andalusia, Spain in 2002. Designed by Mariano Roldán, it was installed in ancient ruins on the one-thousandth anniversary of the death of Almanzor, a military leader of Islamic Spain and seen as one of the greatest leaders of Al-Andalus. It was originally located in the Marinid Walls of Algeciras before being removed for restoration.

In August 2013, the Algeciras City Hall, governed by People's Party, removed the statue in order to repair its patina and complete other restorations. The local Deputy for Culture, Pilar Pintor, said that it would be removed to a more historically relevant location after the original location, once thought to be archeological remains of an Islamic site, was re-assessed as Christian ruins. An ancient kiln, discovered in these ruins several years prior, was to be placed at the statue's original site, with the local council explaining that it signified the importance of ceramics in Algeciras' history.

In November 2016, with no update on the restoration of the statue, the matter was brought up in the City Hall by Leonor Rodríguez, a council member from the left-wing party Podemos. She accused the local government of hiding history. The following June, the statue was found covered in a sheet in a warehouse; Socialist Workers' Party councillor Fran Fernández accused the PP of not looking after local heritage.

As of August 2020, the statue is still not on public display.

== See also ==
- Bust of Abd al-Rahman III, Cadrete
