= Bust of Abd al-Rahman III, Cadrete =

A bronze bust of Abd al-Rahman III, the first Caliph of Córdoba, was unveiled in June 2016 in the small Spanish town of Cadrete near Zaragoza in Aragon. Three years later, it was removed by the right-wing new local government. The removal prompted debate on how Spain should interpret the legacy of Al-Andalus, the Muslim realms of the Middle Ages.

== Background ==
Abd al-Rahman III, the eighth and final Emir and first Caliph of Córdoba, ordered the construction of Cadrete's castle in 935 AD while in the area to crush a rebellion by the Banu Tujib vassal dynasty. A bust commissioned in his honor was unveiled on 18 June 2016 in the town's Plaza de Aragón, and celebrated with a medieval fair.

The bust was sculpted by Fernando Ortiz Villarroya of Teruel. Ortiz is linked to Cadrete as his partner is from there. He took no payment for his work, though casting it in bronze cost €7,000 of public money. He characterises the work of art as "a simple portrait. It has a stern facial expression because he was a leader, but also tender because it is stylised".

== Controversy and reactions ==
=== Removal ===
Ortiz said that in 2017 a member of the far-right Vox political party struck the bust with a 4x4, and another group vandalised it with paint. He chose not to press charges.

In June 2019, local elections resulted in the right-wing People's Party needing an alliance with Citizens and Vox to form government. Three days after the new government was formed, Vox's proposal to remove the bust was enacted. The explanation was that it allegedly caused "division and confrontation" and that the prominence of the Plaza de Aragón required symbols identifiable to all residents. All opposition parties and Citizens condemned the removal, with Podemos local leader Nacho Escartín asking if the statue of Augustus Caesar – namesake of Zaragoza – would be removed from that city.

The bust was removed to the third floor of the town hall, where there is an information centre about the castle, with the promise that it would be displayed at an upcoming museum at the castle. Around 50 people protested the removal. The information centre closed in June 2020.

=== Remarks on removing statues of historical figures ===
Columnist Víctor Orcástegui of the Heraldo de Aragón argued that the logic of removing the bust would also apply to the statue of Augustus as he was a foreign pagan invader, and drew a parallel between Vox's activism and that of Barcelona left-wing mayor Ada Colau against that city's statue of Christopher Columbus. Ortiz disagrees with suggestions that the Law of Historical Memory that bans public memorials to the regime of Francisco Franco could also be used to remove statues of medieval conquerors like Abd al-Rahman III, as well as of conquistadores like Hernán Cortés. In July 2020, the Cadrete episode was brought up in the Parliament of Andalusia by Pilar González of the left-wing Adelante Andalucía party amidst the context of debate over statues due to the George Floyd protests; she said it was hypocritical for the right-wing to pick and choose when to preserve or remove statues.

=== Historian ===
José Luis Corral, a medievalist from the University of Zaragoza, accused Vox of rewriting history for political motives. He said that Abd al-Rahman was no more of a dictator than his Christian monarch opponents, as was the nature of life a millennium ago. He added that Al-Andalus could not be classed as a foreign occupation, as there is no historical or genetic evidence for mass migration of Arabs, rather the inhabitants converted.

Abd al-Rahman's physical appearance and genealogy has been mentioned by Corral to justify the caliph as a Spaniard and not a foreigner. He had fair-coloured eyes, skin and hair, and according to the Muslim chronicler Ibn Hazm, he dyed his hair dark to justify his rule as a descendant of the Islamic prophet Muhammad. His immediate female ancestors were born in the Christian kingdoms in the north of the Iberian peninsula; five generations of Cordobese leaders, from Abd al-Rahman III's great grandfather to his own grandson, were born to Basque women who were married for alliances or taken as slaves.

== See also ==
- Statue of Almanzor, Algeciras
