= Canales de la Sierra =

- Municipality
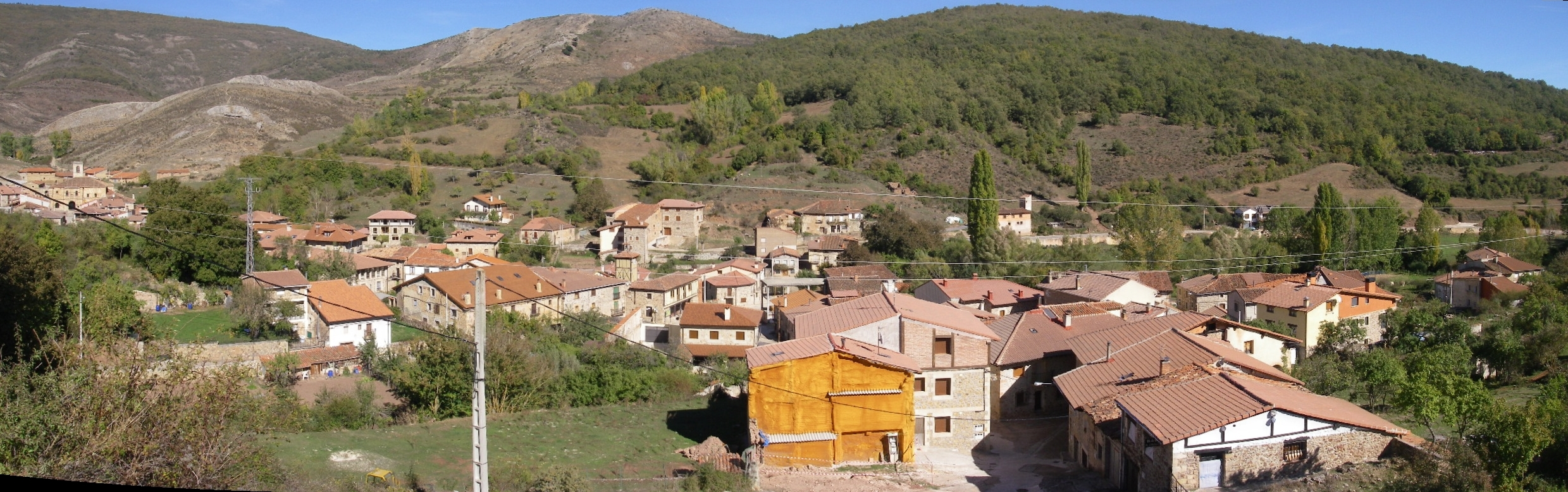
- Skyline of Canales de la Sierra

- Location within La Rioja, Spain Location within Spain
- Coordinates: 42°08′28″N 3°01′27″W
- Country: Spain
- Autonomous community: La Rioja
- Comarca: Anguiano

Government
  - Mayor: José Luis Vicario Benito de Valle (PSOE)

Area
  - Total: 54.44 km^{2} (21.02 sq mi)
- Elevation: 1,057 m (3,468 ft)

Population (2025-01-01)
  - Total: 84
- Demonym(s): canaliego, ga
- Postal code: 26326

Canales de la Sierra is a village in the province and autonomous community of La Rioja, Spain. The municipality covers an area of 54.44 square kilometres (21.02 sq mi) and as of 2011 had a population of 95 people.
