= Abd al-Malik al-Muzaffar =

Āmirid ruler of al-Andalus from 1002 to 1008

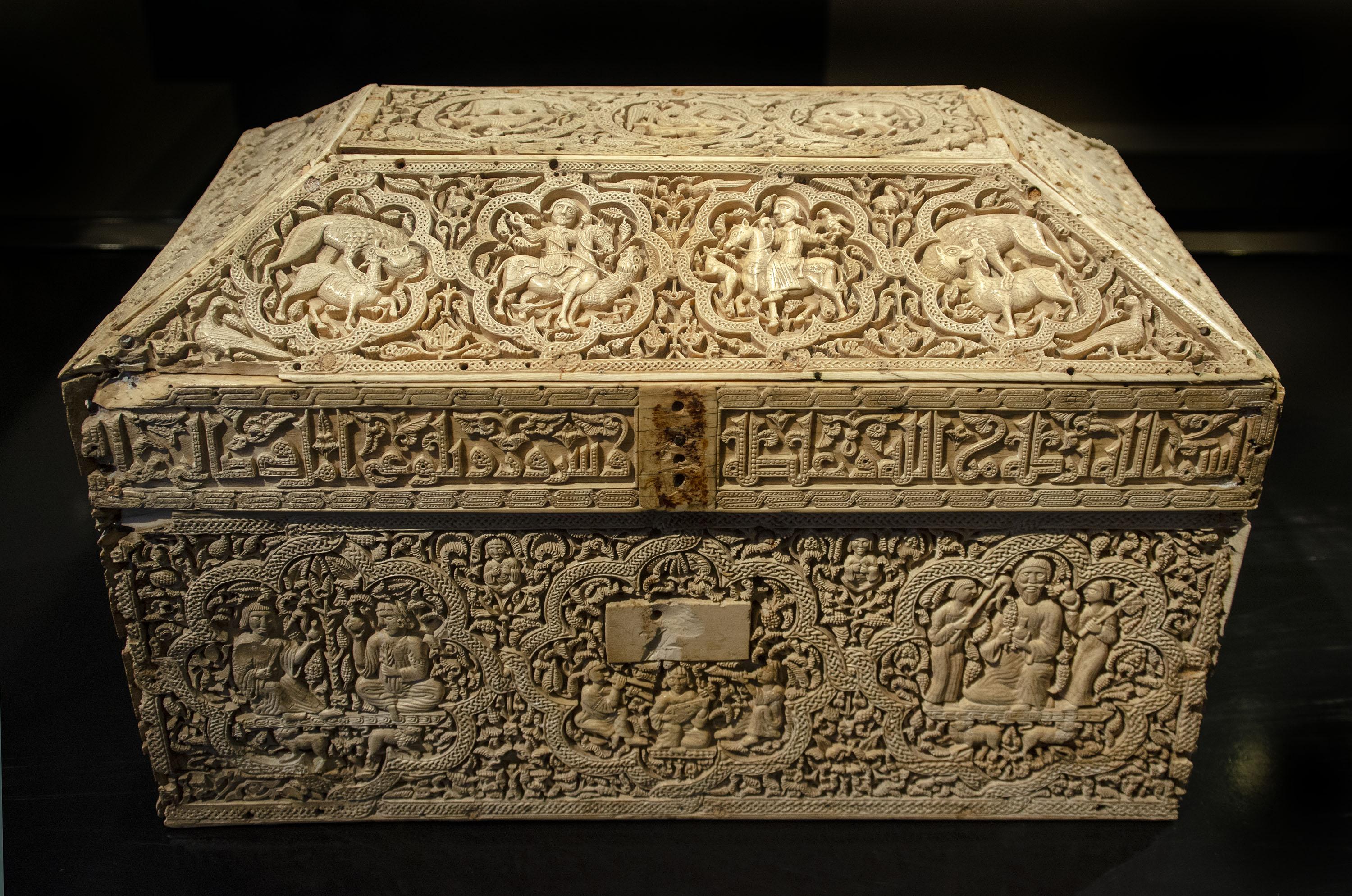
Front face of the Leyre Casket, made for ʿAbd al-Malik in 1004/5.

Abd al-Malik, originally called Sayf al-Dawla, later al-Muẓaffar (Note: Arabic: عبد الملك المظفر. His full Arabic name comprises a kunya (Abū Marwān), ism (ʿAbd al-Malik), nasab (Ibn Abī ʿĀmir), nisba (al-Maʿāfirī) and laḳab (al-Muẓaffar).) (?975 – 20 October 1008), (Note: 16 Ṣafar 399 in the Islamic calendar.) was the second Amirid ruler of al-Andalus, ruling from 1002 until his death. Like his father and predecessor, al-Mansur, he was the actual power behind the Caliph of Córdoba. The six-year government of al-Muẓaffar was a period of internal peace and prosperity. Later historians likened it to the sābiʿ al-arūs, the first seven days of marriage, and recalled it as a golden age before the Andalusian fitna (civil wars) began in 1009.

In 997, the Maghrāwa leader in Africa, Zīrī ibn ʿAṭīya, renounced his allegiance to Córdoba. In response, al-Manṣūr dispatched Wāḍiḥ al-Ṣiḳlabī, governor of the Central March, to Africa at the head of a large army. He then sent his son to reinforce Wadih. The two commanders defeated Zīrī, captured Fez and established Córdoban rule throughout all of Morocco and even into central North Africa. ʿAbd al-Malik was appointed governor of Africa.

The principal sources for al-Muzaffar's government are the Dhakhīra of Ibn Bassām, the Bayān of Ibn ʿIdhārī and the Aʿmāl al-aʿlām of Ibn al-Khaṭīb. On 10 August 1002, (Note: 28 Ramaḍān 392.) just days after his father's death, ʿAbd al-Malik was invested by the Caliph Hishām II with the office ḥājib. He reduced the taxes levied on the citizens of Córdoba by one sixth. He also removed ethnic Arab aristocrats from the administration. He was easily able to handle the several conspiracies mounted against him.

Militarily, ʿAbd al-Malik followed his father's policy exactly. He directed either a summer campaign (ṣāʾifa) or a winter campaign (shātiya) against one of the Christian powers lying beyond the marches (thughūr) in every year of his government. In 1003, he attacked southern Francia (today the Spanish provincia of Catalonia), devastating the countryside around Barcelona and razing 35 fortresses. In 1005, he attacked Castile. In 1006, he attacked Navarre, probably intending to take Pamplona, which he approached but did not capture. In 1007, he again attacked Castile in a campaign that was called the "victorious raid" (ghazāt al-naṣr). He took Clunia by force and carried off enormous booty. This feat earned him the honorific by which he is now known, "the victor" (al-muzaffar) replacing "sword of the dynasty" (sayf al-dawla). In the winter of 1007–1008, he captured a castle called San Martín. He died of angina while preparing his next campaign against Castile. He was succeeded by his brother, ʿAbd al-Raḥmān Shanjwilo.

== Notes ==
Explanatory footnotes

Citations

== Sources ==
- Lévi-Provençal, Évariste (1993). "al-Muẓaffar". In Bosworth, C. E.; van Donzel, E.; Heinrichs, W. P. & Pellat, Ch. (eds.). The Encyclopaedia of Islam, Second Edition. Volume VII: Mif–Naz. Leiden: E. J. Brill. pp. 815–816. ISBN 978-90-04-09419-2.
- Makki, Mahmoud (1994). "The Political History of al-Andalus (92/711–897/1492)". In Salma Khadra Jayyusi (ed.). The Legacy of Muslim Spain. Brill. pp. 3–87.
