= Baños de Rioja =

- Municipality
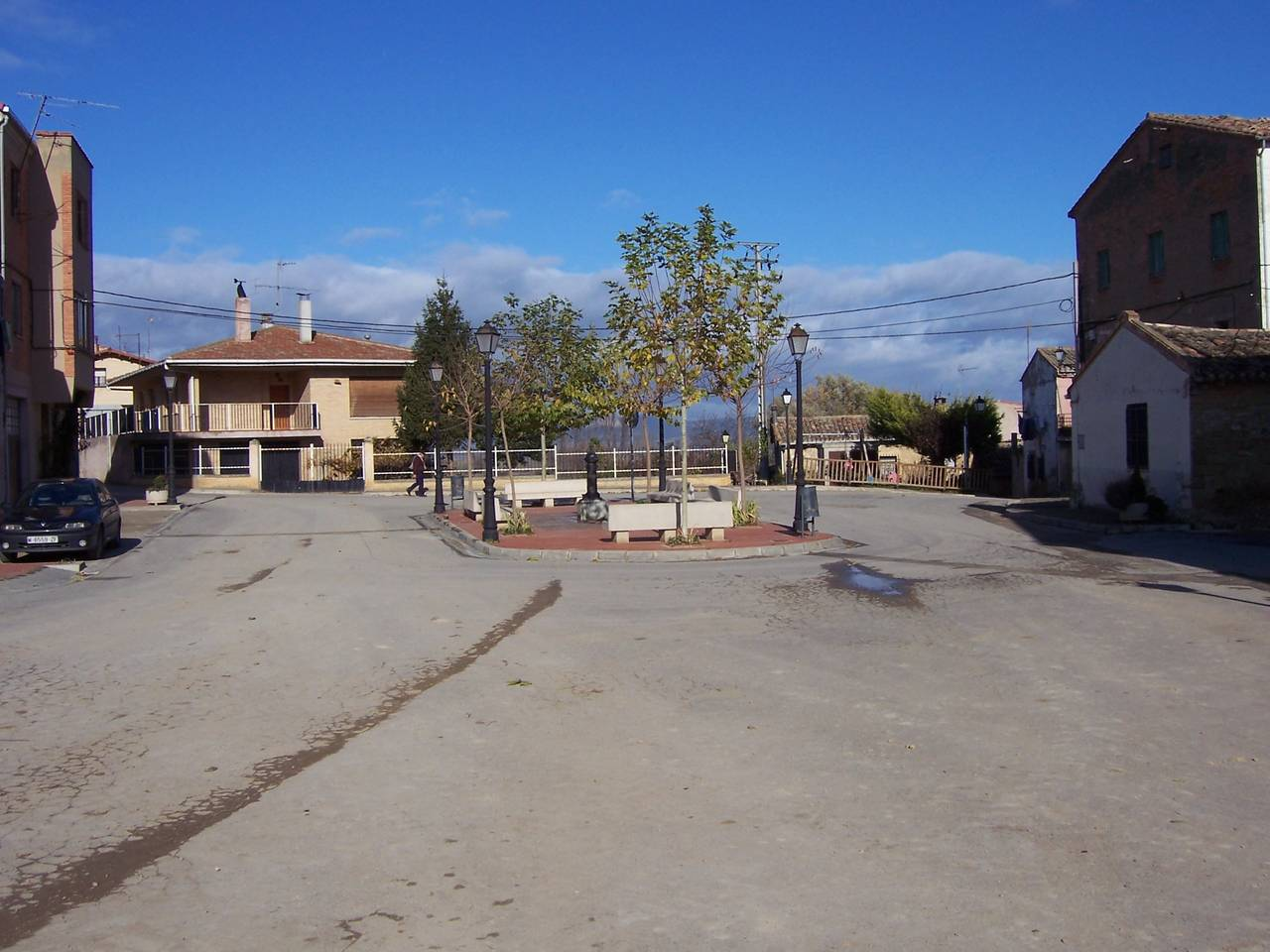
- Main square

- Location within La Rioja, Spain Location within Spain
- Coordinates: 42°30′43″N 2°56′42″W
- Country: Spain
- Autonomous community: La Rioja
- Comarca: Santo Domingo de la Calzada

Government
  - Mayor: Jesús Ruiz Quintanilla (PSOE)

Area
  - Total: 9.23 km^{2} (3.56 sq mi)
- Elevation: 550 m (1,800 ft)

Population (2025-01-01)
  - Total: 86
- Postal code: 26241

Baños de Rioja is a village in the province and autonomous community of La Rioja, Spain. The municipality covers an area of 9.23 square kilometres (3.56 sq mi) and as of 2011 had a population of 92 people.

== Tourist attractions ==
=== Parish Church of Magdalena ===
Built of stone masonry, It was enlarged and modified between the 15th and 17th centuries.

=== Ermita del Pilar ===
Located two kilometers from the center of town center, across the Rio Oja.

=== Strong Tower ===
Built in the 13th century, and probably belonged to the lineage of the Lopez de Haro.

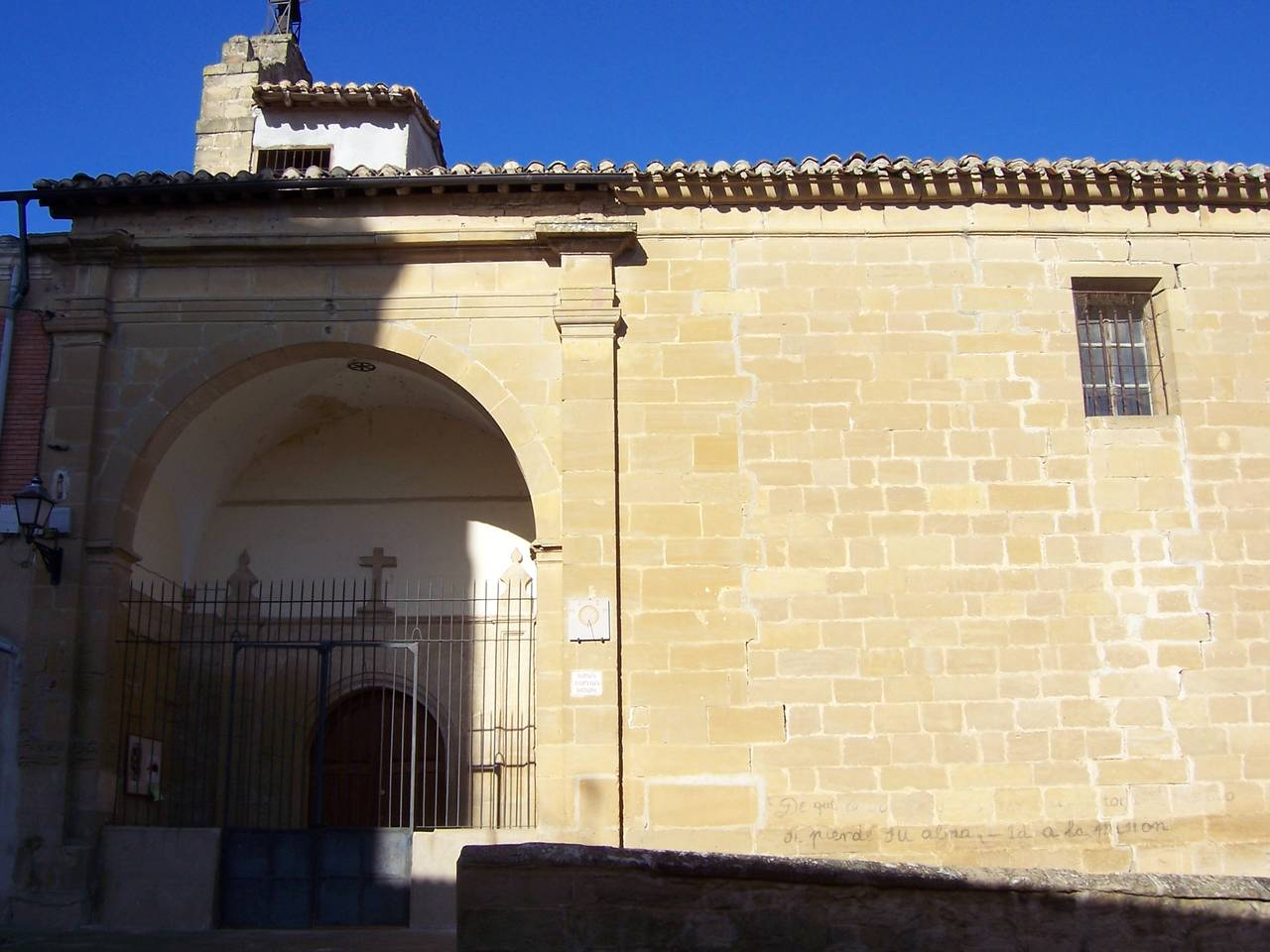
Parish Church of Magdalena

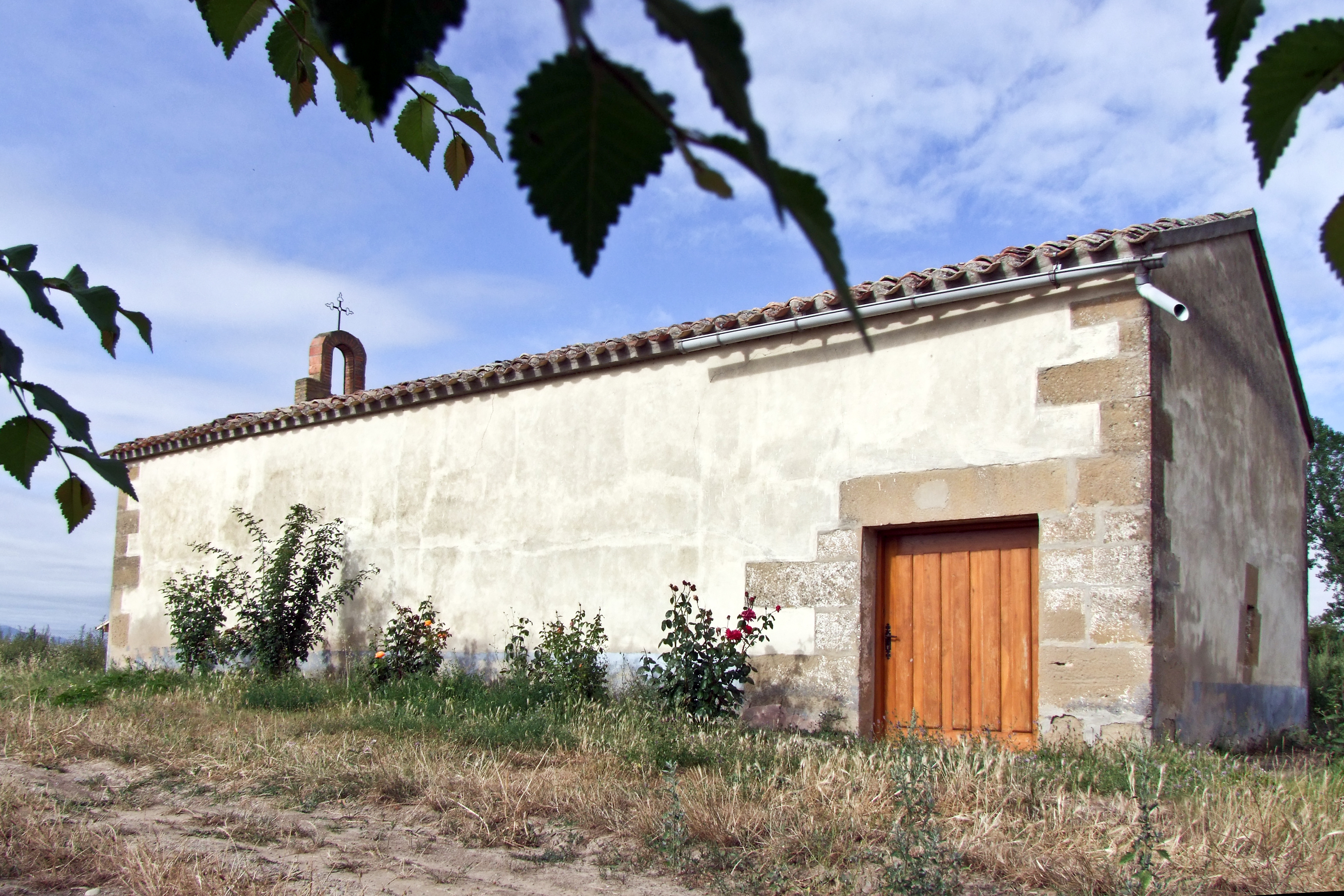
Ermita del Pilar

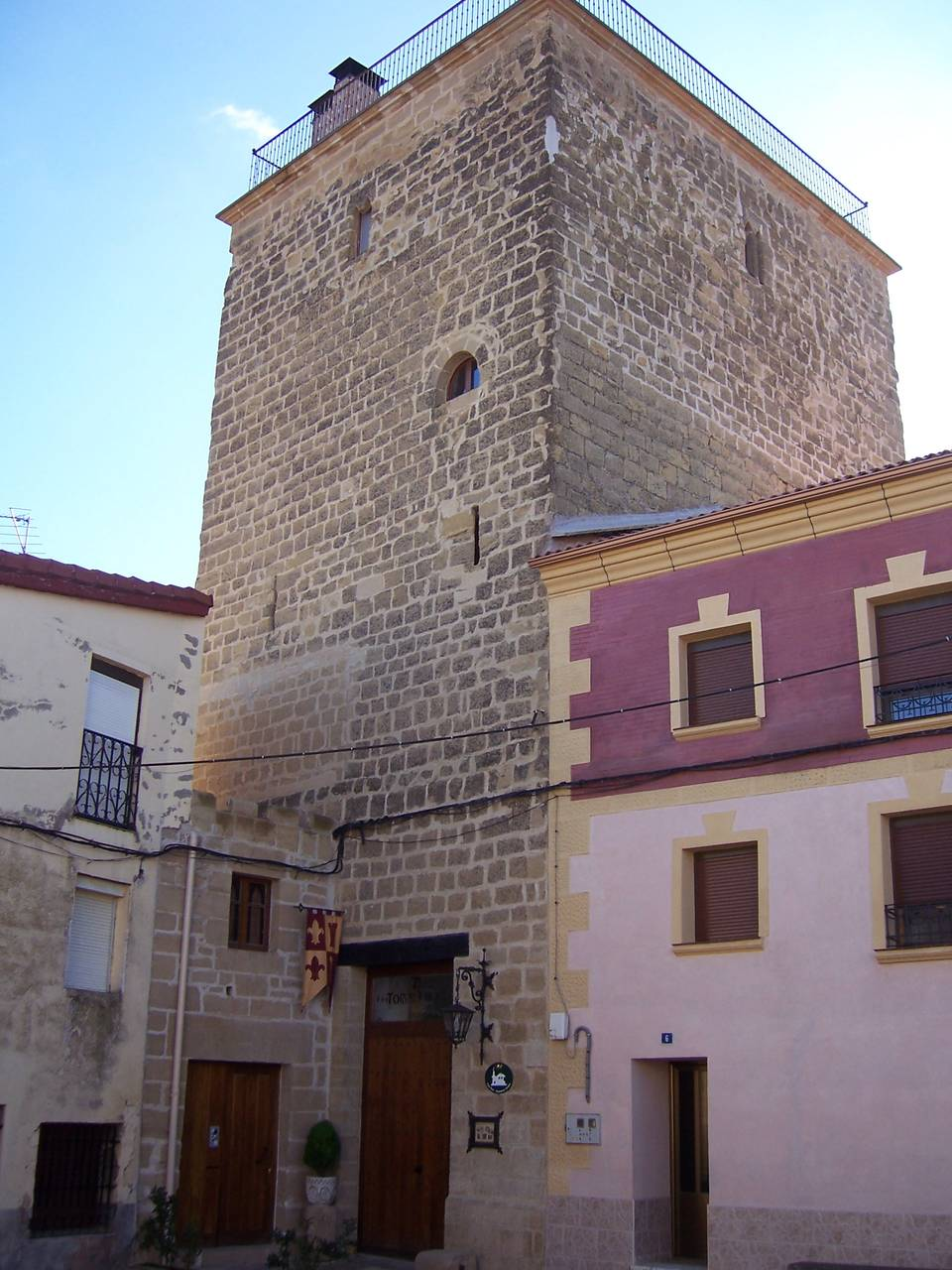
Strong Tower
