= 1110s =

Decade

The 1110s was a decade of the Julian Calendar which began on January 1, 1110, and ended on December 31, 1119.

== Events ==
=== 1110 ===
==== By date ====
- May 5: Lunar eclipse, in which the moon becomes totally dark (according to the Peterborough Chronicle), due to an earlier volcanic eruption putting aerosols into the upper atmosphere of the earth, thus cutting off the earthlight.

==== By place ====
====== Asia ======
- Second Chola invasion of Kalinga.

====== Levant ======
- Spring – Mawdud ibn Altuntash, Turkic ruler (atabeg) of Mosul, leads an expedition to capture the territories of the Crusaders (belonging to the County of Edessa) east of the river Euphrates. He besieges the fortress city of Edessa, but is forced to retreat when King Baldwin I of Jerusalem (with the support of Armenian forces sent by Kogh Vasil) intervenes with a Crusader relief force.
- February–May – Crusaders under Baldwin I besiege Beirut. Genoese and Pisan ships blockade the harbour; Fatimid ships from Tyre and Sidon try in vain to break the blockade. The Fatimid governor flees by night through the Italian fleet to Cyprus. On May 13, Baldwin captures the city by assault and the Italians carry out a massacre among the inhabitants.
- October–December – Crusaders under Baldwin I (supported by King Sigurd I) besiege Sidon. Norwegian ships blockade the harbour, but are nearly dispersed by a powerful Fatimid flotilla from Tyre. They are saved by the arrival of a Venetian squadron under Doge Ordelafo Faliero. On December 4, the city capitulates (under notable terms) to Baldwin.
- December – Tancred, Italo-Norman prince of Galilee, brings the Crusader castle Krak des Chevaliers in Syria under his control. He remains regent of the Principality of Antioch in the name of his cousin Bohemond II.

====== Europe ======
- Henry V, King of Germany, invades Italy with a large army and concludes an agreement with Pope Paschal II at Sutri. Henry renounces the right of investiture (a dispute with the former Henry IV). In return, Paschal promises to crown him emperor and to restore to the Holy Roman Empire all the lands given to the German church (since the time of Charlemagne).
- July 25 – Henry V marries 8-year-old Matilda (daughter of King Henry I of England). She is crowned Queen of the Romans in a ceremony at Mainz. After the betrothal Matilda is placed into custody of Bruno, archbishop of Trier, who is tasked with educating her in German culture, manners and government.
- The dukedom of Bohemia is secured for Vladislaus I following the death of Svatopluk ("the Lion") who is assassinated. Vladislaus receives support from Henry V and will rule until 1125.
- Almoravid forces under Sultan Ali ibn Yusuf occupy Zaragoza (modern Spain), bringing all of Andalusia's Muslim states under Almoravid control.

====== England ======
- King Henry I has improvements made at Windsor Castle, including a chapel, so that he can use the castle as his formal residence.

==== By topic ====
====== Literature ======
- The Rus' Primary Chronicle is completed. The work is considered to be a fundamental source in the history of the East Slavs.
- Approximate date of composition of Jayamkondar's Kalingattuparani, a Tamil epic celebrating the victory of Kulottunga Chola I over the Kalinga king Anantavarman Chodaganga in the Chola invasion of Kalinga that takes place around this year.

====== Religion ======
- Construction begins on Fontevraud Abbey in the French duchy of Anjou.

=== 1111 ===
==== By place ====
====== Levant ======
- Battle of Shaizar: Sultan Muhammad I Tapar appoints Mawdud ibn Altuntash, Turkic governor (atabeg) of Mosul, to lead a Seljuk expedition against the Crusaders. The composite force includes Muslim contingents from Damascus, Diyarbakır, Ahlat and some Persian troops, headed by Bursuq ibn Bursuq from Hamadan. The Crusaders (16,000 men), led by King Baldwin I of Jerusalem, are cut off from their supplies, and within two weeks (due to constant Seljuk skirmishes) forced to fall back on Afamiya in northern Syria.
- Winter – Crusaders, led by Baldwin I, besiege Tyre, without a supporting fleet. While besieging the town, a Byzantine embassy arrives in the Crusader camp. The Byzantines try to persuade Baldwin to join a coalition against Tancred, Italo-Norman prince of Galilee, but he refuses.

====== Europe ======
- March 27 – Battle of the Salnitsa river: Prince Vladimir of Kievan Rus' inflicts a crushing defeat on the Cumans (Polovtsy).
- April 13 – Henry V is crowned as Holy Roman Emperor by Pope Paschal II. Henry returns to Germany where he strengthens his power by granting privileges to the German nobles of the region of the Upper Rhine.
- October 5 – 18-year-old Baldwin VII succeeds his father, Robert II, as Count of Flanders until 1119.
- Almoravid forces under Syr ibn Abi Bakr capture Santarém and Sintra. The efforts of the Berbers to reconquer lost ground lead to the sack of Coimbra. The same year the city revolts against their lord in Portugal.
- The commune of Lodi Vecchio (known as Laus Pompeia) is besieged and destroyed by Milanese troops in northern Italy.

====== Ireland ======
- Domnall Gerrlámhach (Ua Briain) becomes king of the Hebrides and the Isle of Man, following a request from the people of the kingdom of Munster to send them a ruler.

====== Asia ======
- The Donglin Academy, a Chinese educational institution, is established in Wuxi during the Northern Song dynasty.

==== By topic ====
====== Religion ======
- The Synod of Rathbreasail marks the transition of the Irish church, from a monastic to a diocesan structure.

=== 1112 ===
==== By place ====
====== Byzantine Empire ======
- Spring – Malik Shah, Seljuk ruler of the Sultanate of Rum, begins incursions into Anatolia. He marches on Philadelphia with his army, but is halted by the Byzantines under Gabras, governor of the Theme of Chaldia.

====== Levant ======
- Spring – Seljuk forces under Toghtekin, Turkic governor of Damascus, intervene at Tyre, and force King Baldwin I of Jerusalem to raise the siege.
- April 10 – The Crusaders fight their way back to Acre (modern Israel).

====== Europe ======
- February 3 – Ramon Berenguer III ("the Great"), count of Barcelona, obtains the county of Provence through his marriage to the heiress, Douce I. Ramon's dominion stretches as far east as Nice (modern France).
- May 22 – Henry, count of Portugal, dies from wounds received during a siege at Astorga. He is succeeded by his 3-year-old son Afonso I, but his mother Theresa desires to rule Portugal alone and becomes regent.
- Duke Bolesław III Wrymouth of Poland has his half-brother Zbigniew blinded and thrown into a dungeon in Tyniec Abbey. Archbishop Martin I excommunicates Bolesław for committing this terrible crime.
- Otto ("the Rich"), count of Ballenstedt, is appointed duke of Saxony by Emperor Henry V, but is later stripped of his title.
- Salzwedel in the Altmark (modern Germany) is founded.
- The Margraviate of Baden is founded by Herman II.

==== By topic ====
====== Literature ======
- Gallus Anonymus, Polish chronicler and historian, begins to write Gesta principum Polonorum, to Bolesław III.

====== Religion ======
- Easter – The citizens of Laon in France, having proclaimed a commune, murder Bishop Waldric in his cathedral.

=== 1113 ===
==== By place ====
====== Byzantine Empire ======
- Spring – Siege of Nicaea: Malik Shah, Seljuk ruler of the Sultanate of Rum, sends an expedition through Bithynia to the very walls of Nicaea. Seljuk forces raid Abydos on the Hellespont, with its rich custom-houses. Malik Shah attacks and captures Pergamum. Emperor Alexios I Komnenos sets out to meet the Seljuk invaders. He lifts the siege at Nicaea and wins a complete victory near Cotyaeum (modern Turkey).

====== Levant ======
- January 15 – The Order of Knights of the Hospital of Saint John of Jerusalem (Knights Hospitaller), founded to protect pilgrims to the Holy Land, is formally recognized by the papal bull (proclamation) Pie Postulatio Voluntatis issued by Pope Paschal II.
- June 28 – Battle of Al-Sannabra: The Crusaders led by Baldwin I are defeated (due to a feigned flight) by a Seljuk army under Mawdud ibn Altuntash, the Turkic governor (atabeg) of Mosul, at the Jordan River south of the Sea of Galilee. Mawdud sends raiding columns to ravage the countryside and sacks the town of Nablus.
- September – King Baldwin I of Jerusalem marries Adelaide del Vasto, the wealthy widow of Count Roger I of Sicily ('Bosso') in Acre. She lands in Palestine accompanied by Arab soldiers (her personal bodyguard) and travels to Jerusalem. Their marriage is bigamous, because Baldwin is legally still married to his second wife Arda of Armenia.

====== Europe ======
- April 16 – Sviatopolk II, Grand Prince of Kiev, dies after a 20-year reign and is succeeded by his 60-year-old cousin Vladimir II Monomakh. He begins a campaign against the Cumans on the steppe in an effort to reunite the land of Kievan Rus'.
- September 7 – The Republic of Pisa signs a treaty with Ramon Berenguer III ('the Great'), count of Barcelona. The Pisan fleet embarks on a campaign against the Moors in the Balearic Islands.
- The Republic of Florence conquers the neighboring city of Montecascioli, as part of its effort to extend its domination over the contado (provinces of Italy).
- Peter Abelard, a French scholastic philosopher, opens his school in Paris, on the heights of Montagne Sainte-Geneviève (approximate date).
- Queen Urraca of Castile unsuccessfully attempts to seize the city of Burgos from her ex-husband, King Alfonso the Battler.

====== Asia ======
- A Thousand Li of Rivers and Mountains, the only extant work by the Chinese painter Wang Ximeng, is finished.
- King Suryavarman II begins his reign as ruler of the Khmer Empire (modern Cambodia).

==== By topic ====
====== Religion ======
- Bridlington Priory is founded in England, in the Diocese of York (approximate date).

=== 1114 ===
==== By place ====
====== Europe ======
- January 7 – Emperor Henry V marries Matilda (or Maude), 11-year-old daughter of King Henry I of England, at Worms (modern Germany). A political conflict breaks out across the Holy Roman Empire after the marriage, triggered when Henry arrests Chancellor Adalbert and various other German princes.
- Count Ramon Berenguer III (the Great) of Barcelona, joins the expedition to the Balearic Islands. A Pisan and Catalan fleet (some 450 ships), supported by a large army, conquer Ibiza and Mallorca. They destroy the bases on the islands used by Moorish pirates to prey on Mediterranean shipping.
- Battle of Martorell: The Almoravid governor of Zaragoza, Muhàmmad ibn al-Hajj, launches an expedition against the County of Barcelona, but is defeated in an ambush near Martorell.
- As part of the Norman expansion southward, Count Routrou II enters the service of King Alfonso I (the Battler) of Aragon.

====== Asia ======
- Emperor Hui Zong of the Song dynasty sends a gift of Chinese musical instruments, for use in royal banquets to the Korean court of Goryeo, by request from King Yejong.

==== By topic ====
====== Earthquake ======
- November 29 – A large earthquake damages the areas of the Crusaders in the Middle East. From Antioch and Mamistra to Marash and Edessa are hit by the shocks.

====== Religion ======
- The cathedral of Chichester in England, constructed of wood, is destroyed by fire.
- Pontigny Abbey, a Cistercian monastery, is founded (located in Burgundy).

=== 1115 ===
==== By place ====
====== Levant ======
- September 14 – Battle of Sarmin: The Crusaders, under Prince Roger of Salerno, surprise and rout the Seljuk Turkish army (some 8,000 men), led by Emir Bursuq ibn Bursuq, at Sarmin (modern Syria). Bursuq barely avoids capture, and escapes with a few hundred horsemen. Roger reoccupies the fortress of Kafartab, and consolidates his territory around Antioch.
- The Crusader castle of Montreal (located in Jordan) is commissioned by King Baldwin I of Jerusalem, during an expedition against the Seljuk Turks.

====== Europe ======
- February 11 – Battle of Welfesholz: Duke Lothair of Supplinburg joins the rebellious Saxon forces, and defeats the German Imperial Army of Emperor Henry V at Welfesholz, in Saxony-Anhalt (modern Germany).
- July 24 – Matilda, margravine of Tuscany, dies at Bondeno. During her reign she waged an intermittent war with Emperor Henry IV over the inheritance rights of her fiefs in Lombardy and Tuscany.

====== Asia ======
- The Jin Dynasty (or Great Jin) is created by the Jurchen tribal chieftain Taizu (or Aguda). He establishes a dual-administration system: a Chinese-style bureaucracy to rule over northern and northeast China.
- The 19-year-old Minamoto no Tameyoshi, Japanese nobleman and samurai, gains recognition by suppressing a riot against Emperor Toba at a monastery near Kyoto (approximate date).

====== Mesoamerica ======
- The Mixtec ruler Eight Deer Jaguar Claw (or 8 Deer) is defeated in battle and sacrificed by a coalition of city-states, led by his brother-in law 4 Wind, at Tilantongo in the Mixteca Alta region (modern Mexico).

==== By topic ====
====== Religion ======
- Arnulf of Chocques is accused of sexual relations with a Muslim woman. He is briefly removed from his position as patriarch of Jerusalem.
- Peter Abelard, French scholastic philosopher, becomes master of the cathedral school of Notre-Dame and meets Héloïse d'Argenteuil.
- Clairvaux Abbey is founded by Bernard, French abbot and a major leader in the reform of Benedictine monasticism, in France.
- Hugh of Saint Victor, French theologian and writer, joins the Victorines (at the Augustinian Abbey of St. Victor) in Paris.

=== 1116 ===
==== By place ====
====== Byzantine Empire ======
- Autumn – Battle of Philomelion: Emperor Alexios I (Komnenos) leads an expedition into Anatolia and meets the Seljuk army under Sultan Malik Shah (near Philomelium). The Byzantines introduce a new battle formation of Alexios' devising, the parataxis (a defensive formation, consisting of a hollow square, with the baggage in the centre). During the battle, the Seljuk Turks mount several attacks on the formations, but all are repulsed. The Byzantine cavalry makes two counterattacks; the first is unsuccessful. But a second attack, led by Nikephoros Bryennios (the Younger), breaks the Seljuk forces, who then turn to flight. The following day Malik Shah again attacks, his army completely surrounding the Byzantines from all sides. The Seljuk Turks are once more repulsed, with many losses. Alexios claims the victory, and Malik Shah is forced to accept a peace treaty, in which he promises to respect the frontiers of the Byzantine Empire.

====== Levant ======
- Summer – The Crusaders under King Baldwin I of Jerusalem undertake an expedition to Egypt and march as far as Akaba on the Red Sea. After the local inhabitants flee from the town, Baldwin constructs castles in Akaba and on a nearby island. He leaves a garrison in both fortresses. The three Crusader strongholds – Montréal, Eilat and Graye – secure the control of the caravan routes between Syria and Egypt.
- Autumn – Baldwin I hastens to Tyre (modern Lebanon) and begins the construction of a new fortress, known as Scandelion Castle, at the Ladder of Tyre, which completes the blockade of the town from the mainland.

====== Europe ======
- February 3 – King Coloman (the Learned) dies after a 21-year reign in which he has consolidated the feudal system in Hungary and expanded the frontier (partly by overthrowing King Peter II of Croatia).
- Ramon Berenguer III (the Great), count of Barcelona, sails to Rome in an effort to gain support from the Italian states and a licence from Pope Paschal II for his crusade against the Moors in Spain.
- July 15 – Ordelafo Faliero, doge of Venice, defeats the Hungarian troops under King Stephen II, who have arrived to relieve Zadar; the remaining towns of Dalmatia surrender to Venice.
- Portuguese forces under Countess Theresa take two Galician cities, Tui and Ourense. In reply, the sister of Theresa, Queen Urraca (the Reckless), attacks Portugal.
- Almoravid troops conquer the Balearic islands, whose Moorish rulers have been severely weakened by Pisan and Catalan raiders.

====== Wales ======
- The Welsh under King Gruffydd ap Rhys of Deheubarth attack Llandovery Castle, but are defeated. Gruffydd also attacks Swansea Castle and destroys the outer walls.

====== Africa ======
- The Zirid ruler of Ifriqiya, Ali ibn Yahya, conquers the island of Jerba, then acting as an independent piratical republic.

==== By topic ====
====== Art and Music ======
- Aak music is introduced to the Korean court, through a large gift of 428 musical instruments as well as 572 costumes and ritual dance objects from China, by Emperor Hui Zong of the Song dynasty.

====== Religion ======
- Construction starts on the Chennakeshava Temple (located on the Yagachi River) commissioned by King Vishnuvardhana at Belur in India.
- The monastery at Peterborough in England is destroyed by fire.

=== 1117 ===
==== By place ====
====== Europe ======
- King Stephen II of Hungary regains Dalmatia from Venice while the Venetians are on a naval expedition. Doge Ordelafo Faliero dies in battle (near Zadar) against the Hungarians. Faliero is succeeded by Domenico Michiel, who reconquers more territory and agrees to a 5-year truce with Hungary.
- Ramon Berenguer III (the Great), count of Barcelona, inherits Cerdanya (located between the Pyrenees and the Ebro River) which becomes part of the Principality of Catalonia.
- Vladislaus I, duke of Bohemia, abdicates in favor of his brother Bořivoj II, but retains much of the actual power.
- The Almoravids briefly reconquer Coimbra (modern Portugal).
- January 3 – 1117 Verona earthquake. The earthquake is rated at VII (Very strong) on the Mercalli intensity scale, and strikes northern Italy and Germany. The epicentre of the first shock is near Verona, the city which suffers the most damage. The outer wall of the amphitheatre is partially felled, and the standing portion is damaged in a later earthquake of 1183. Many other churches, monasteries, and ancient monuments are destroyed or seriously damaged, eliminating much of Verona's early medieval architecture and providing space for a massive Romanesque rebuilding.

====== Seljuk Empire ======
- Battle of Ghazni: Seljuk forces under Ahmad Sanjar (supporting the claim of Bahram-Shah) invade Afghanistan and defeat the ruling Sultan Arslan-Shah. Bahram succeeds his brother as ruler of the Ghaznavid Empire.

====== Africa ======
- Conflict between the de facto independent Muslim republics of Gabès and Mahdia (modern Tunisia) in Ifriqiya. Madhia is supported by the Zirid Dynasty while Gabes receives the aid of Roger II, count of Sicily.

====== Levant ======
- The Crusaders led by King Baldwin I of Jerusalem raid Pelusium in Egypt and burn the city to the ground. Baldwin marches back to Palestine and strengthens the fortifications of the southern frontier.

====== Asia ======
- King Mahaabarana Adeettiya (Koimala) from the Theemuge Dynasty becomes the first king to rule over the whole Maldives. He reclaims the northern atolls from the Indian invaders.
- The sōhei or warrior monks of Mii-dera and Enryaku-ji unite their forces to attack Nara in Japan.

==== By topic ====
====== Education ======
- Merton Priory (near London) is consecrated at Huntingdon. The priory becomes an important centre of learning and diplomacy in England.

====== Technology ======
- The magnetic compass is first used for maritime navigation purposes during the Song Dynasty in China.

=== 1118 ===
==== By place ====
====== Byzantine Empire ======
- August 15 – Emperor Alexios I Komnenos dies after a 37-year reign, in which he has regained control over western Anatolia (modern Turkey). He stabilizes his frontiers against the wars with the Normans in the western Balkans, and the Seljuk Turks in the East. Alexios is succeeded by his 30-year-old son, John II Komnenos (the Good), as ruler of the Byzantine Empire.

====== Europe ======
- Peace between England and Flanders is agreed upon.

====== British Isles ======
- Enna mac Donnchada mac Murchada becomes King of Dublin in Ireland.
- Cu Faifne mac Congalaig becomes King of Uí Failghe in Ireland.
- Maelsechlainn Ua Faelain becomes King of the Déisi Muman in Ireland.
- The cantrefs of Rhos and Rhufoniog are annexed by Gruffudd ap Cynan, King of Gwynedd in Wales.
- The Archbishop of York is no longer required to be crowned by the Archbishop of Canterbury.
- Reconstruction begins on Peterborough Cathedral in England, destroyed by fire in 1116.

====== Eastern Europe ======
- Đorđe Vojislavljević ruler of Serbia, is overthrown by Uroš I of Raška.
- George I of Duklja is overthrown by his cousin Grubeša.
- Radostl becomes Bishop of Krakow.
- Zbraslav, now part of Prague, is founded.
- Sylvester of Kiev becomes bishop of Pereiaslav.

====== France ======
- A rebellion against Henry I of England breaks out in Normandy.
- Alberich of Rheims becomes Master at the school of Rheims.
- Charles I, Count of Flanders marries Margaret of Clermont.
- Peter Abelard and Héloïse d'Argenteuil have a child and marry secretly in Paris. Her uncle Fulbert has Abelard castrated, and both Abelard and Héloïse enter religious orders.
- Amaury IV of Montfort divorces his wife Richilde, daughter of Baldwin II, Count of Hainaut.
- Wulgrin III becomes Count of Angoulême.
- Gervais becomes Count of Rethel.
- Montlhéry Castle is dismantled by Louis VI of France.

====== Germany ======
- Magdeburg is almost destroyed by fire.
- Reichenbach Abbey is founded.
- Zwickau, Eisenstadt, Kirchgandern, and Wolfenbüttel are first mentioned.
- Otto of Bamberg is suspended by the Pope, and Norbert of Xanten defends himself against charges of heresy, at the Synod of Fritzlar.

====== Italy ======
- January 24 – Pope Gelasius II succeeds Pope Paschal II as the 161st pope.
- March 10 – Gregory VIII is elected antipope.
- September 26 – Pisa Cathedral in the March of Tuscany is consecrated by Pope Gelasius II.
- The restoration of Santa Maria in Cosmedin begins.
- The economic competition between Milan and Como drives the two cities to war.

====== Scandinavia ======
- Upon the death of his brother Philip, Inge the Younger becomes sole king of Sweden.
- Þorlákur Runólfsson becomes Bishop of Skálholt.

====== Spain ======
- The Almoravids lose their control of the Ebro valley:
  - Pope Gelasius II grants the status of Crusade to the Christian effort in the Ebro Valley, attracting numerous Gascon, Occitan and Norman knights.
  - December 18 – Alfonso the Battler expels the Moors from Zaragoza. The Aragonese reconquer many of the valleys of the Jalón and the Jiloca.
  - The troops of Ramon Berenguer III, Count of Barcelona, led by archbishop Oleguer Bonestruga, capture Tarragona from the Moors.

====== East Asia ======
- The Genei era begins in Japan.
- The Zenghe era of Emperor Huizong of Song China ends, and the Chonghe era begins.
- The Yongning era of Emperor Chongzong of Western Xia ends.

====== Caucasus ======
- David IV of Georgia captures Lori from the Seljuk Turks.
- David IV of Georgia settles a number of Kipchaks in Georgia.

====== Western Asia ======
- June 11 – Roger of Salerno, Prince of Antioch, captures Azaz from the Seljuk Turks.
- The Byzantine general Philocales captures Sardis, from the Seljuk Sultanate of Rûm.
- Baldwin I of Jerusalem invades Egypt.
- Baldwin of Le Bourg succeeds his cousin Baldwin I, as King of Jerusalem.
- Roman of Le Puy becomes lord of Oultrejordain.
- Joscelin I succeeds Baldwin of Le Bourg, as Count of Edessa.
- Garmond of Picquigny becomes Latin Patriarch of Jerusalem.
- Suleyman I ibn al-Ghazi becomes emir of Aleppo.
- Ahmed Sanjar and Mahmud II proclaim themselves rival Seljuk sultans, upon the death of Mehmed I of Great Seljuk.
- Al-Mustarshid becomes Abbasid caliph.
- Bahram Shah becomes Ghaznavid Emperor.

====== South Asia ======
- June 29 – Vikram Chola becomes regent of the Chola kingdom.
- Battle of Kennagal: The Hoysala Empire defeats the Chalukya.

=== 1119 ===
==== By place ====
====== Levant ======
- June 28 – Battle of Ager Sanguinis: The Crusader army of the Principality of Antioch under Roger of Salerno is ambushed and annihilated (near Sarmada) by the combined Muslim forces (20,000 men) of Ilghazi, the Artuqid ruler of Aleppo. Muslim troops are sent to raid the suburbs of Antioch and sack the port of Saint Symeon. The Crusader fortresses at Atarib, Zardana, Sarmin, Ma'arrat al-Nu'man and Kafr Tab are captured. Ilghazi makes a triumphant entry at Aleppo, Crusader prisoners are dragged in chains – where they are tortured to death in the streets. The massacre leads to the name of the battle, Ager Sanguinis (or "the Field of Death").
- August 14 – Battle of Hab: The Crusaders under King Baldwin II of Jerusalem (supported by forces of Count Pons of Tripoli) defeat Ilghazi's army at Ariha in Syria. Baldwin manages to re-capture all of the Crusader castles and returns to Antioch in triumph. He stabilizes the frontiers and prevents Ilghazi from marching on Antioch.
- Autumn – Hugh de Payns founds the monastic order of the Knights Templar and becomes the first Grand Master. In association with Bernard of Clairvaux, a French abbot and religious leader, he creates the Latin Rule, the code of behavior of the Order. The Templars get the primary task to protect the pilgrime-routes in Palestine.

==== Europe ====
- August 20 – Battle of Brémule: King Henry I of England defeats King Louis VI (the Fat) of France and his 400 knights in Normandy. A skirmish that begins with the French launching a fierce but disordered attack, and ends with the French turning tail. Louis agrees to make peace and formally recognizes William Adelin as duke of Normandy.

==== England ====
- Robert I (de Brus), 1st Lord of Annandale, grants and confirms the church of St. Hilda of Middlesbrough to Whitby.
- September 19 – A severe earthquake hits Gloucestershire and Warwickshire.

==== By topic ====
====== Religion ======
- January 29 – Pope Gelasius II dies in exile after a 1-year pontificate at the Abbey of Cluny. He is succeeded by Callixtus II as the 162nd pope of the Catholic Church.
- March – Olegarius Bonestruga, archbishop of Tarragona, preaches successfully a Crusade against the Moors in Catalonia.
- Council of Reims: Callixtus II concludes peace with Henry I. There are 15 archbishops and over 200 bishops present.
- Council of Toulouse: The Catholic Church condemns the Petrobrusian heresy.

====== Technology ======
- Zhu Yu, a Chinese historian, writes his book Pingzhou Table Talks (published this year), the earliest known use of separate hull compartments in ships. Zhu Yu's book is the first to report the use of a magnetic compass for navigation at sea. The first actual description, however, of the magnetic compass is by another Chinese writer Shen Kuo in his Dream Pool Essays (published in 1088).

== Significant people ==
- Pope Paschal II
- Al-Mustazhir caliph of Baghdad
- Muhammad Tapar Seljuk sultan

== Births ==
1110

- Aelred of Rievaulx, English Cistercian monk and abbot (d. 1167)
- Abraham ben Isaac of Narbonne, Jewish rabbi and writer (approximate date)
- Abraham ibn Daud, Jewish astronomer and historian (d. 1180)
- Walter fitz Alan, Scottish High Steward (approximate date)
- Clarembald of Arras, French theologian and writer (d. 1187)
- Diarmait Mac Murchada, Irish king of Leinster (d. 1171)
- Düsum Khyenpa, Tibetan spiritual leader (karmapa) (d. 1193)
- Odo of Deuil (or Eudes), French abbot and historian (d. 1162)
- Gertrude of Sulzbach, German queen (approximate date)
- Gilbert Foliot, English abbot and bishop (approximate date)
- Hodierna of Jerusalem, countess of Tripoli (approximate date)
- Iorwerth Goch ap Maredudd, Welsh prince (approximate date)
- John Tzetzes, Byzantine grammarian (approximate date)
- Kirik the Novgorodian, Russian monk and chronicler (d. 1156)
- Lhachen Naglug, Indian ruler of Ladakh (approximate date)
- Liu Wansu, Chinese physician of the Jin dynasty (d. 1200)
- Odo de St Amand (or Eudes), French Grand Master of the Knights Templar (d. 1179)
- Phagmo Drupa Dorje Gyalpo, Tibetan Buddhist monk (d. 1170)
- Reginald de Dunstanville, 1st Earl of Cornwall (d. 1175)
- Robert of Torigni, Norman monk and abbot (d. 1186)
- Rohese de Vere, countess of Essex (approximate date)
- Rostislav I, Grand Prince of Kiev (approximate date)
- Vladislaus II (or Vladislav), king of Bohemia (d. 1174)
- William III ("the Child"), count of Burgundy (d. 1127)

1111

- Afonso I (the Conqueror), King of Portugal (d. 1185)
- Agnes of Babenberg, High Duchess of Poland (d. 1163)
- Andrei Bogolyubsky, Prince of Vladimir-Suzdal (d. 1174)
- Henry II, Duke of Limburg (House of Ardenne) (d. 1167)
- Josceline de Bohon, bishop of Salisbury (d. 1184)
- Stephen of Armenia, Armenian nobleman (d. 1165)

1112

- García IV ("the Restorer"), king of Navarre (d. 1150)
- February 3 – Abu Ishaq Ibrahim ibn Ahmad al-Mustazhir, was the son of Abbasid caliph al-Mustazhir and Ismah.
- Henry II (Jasomirgott), duke of Austria (d. 1177)
- Henry IV ("the Blind"), count of Luxembourg (d. 1196)
- Mahaut of Albon, countess of Savoy (d. 1148)
- Sasaki Hideyoshi, Japanese samurai (d. 1184)
- Sibylla of Anjou, countess of Flanders (d. 1165)

1113

- January 11 – Wang Chongyang, Chinese Daoist (d. 1170)
- August 24 – Geoffrey Plantagenet, Count of Anjou ("the Fair") (d. 1151)
- Donnchad I, Earl of Fife (Duncan), Scottish nobleman (d. 1154)
- Frederick of Hallum, Frisian priest and abbot (d. 1175)
- Shams-ul-Mulk Isma'il, Seljuk governor (d. 1135)
- Shun'e (or Tayū no Kimi), Japanese poet (d. 1191)
- Stefan Nemanja, Grand Prince of Serbia (d. 1199)
- Walter de Clifford, English nobleman (d. 1190)

1114

- Al-Suhayli, Moorish scholar and writer (d. 1185)
- Bhāskara II, Indian mathematician (d. 1185)
- Dirk VI (or Theodoric), count of Holland (d. 1157)
- Fujiwara no Shunzei, Japanese nobleman (d. 1204)
- Gebhard III, German nobleman (approximate date)
- Gerard of Cremona, Italian translator (d. 1187)
- Henry of Scotland, 3rd Earl of Northumbria (d. 1152)
- Otto I, German bishop and chronicler (d. 1158)
- Ramon Berenguer IV, count of Barcelona (d. 1162)

1115

- April 18 – Gertrude, German duchess and regent (d. 1143)
- September 18 – Wu, Chinese empress consort (d. 1197)
- Aubrey de Vere, 1st Earl of Oxford (approximate date)
- Berenguer Raymond, count of Provence (d. 1144)
- Erling Skakke, Norwegian nobleman (approximate date)
- Eustathius of Thessalonica, Byzantine archbishop (d. 1195)
- Euthymios Malakes, Byzantine bishop (approximate date)
- Fulk I FitzWarin (or Fulke), English nobleman (d. 1170)
- Gilbert FitzRichard de Clare, 1st Earl of Hertford (d. 1152)
- Hugo Etherianus, Italian cardinal and adviser (d. 1182)
- Joel ben Isaac ha-Levi, German rabbi and writer (d. 1200)
- Li Tao (or Renfu), Chinese historian and writer (d. 1184)
- Magnus IV (the Blind), king of Norway (approximate date)
- Pedro Fernández de Castro, Spanish nobleman (d. 1184)
- Peter Cellensis, French abbot and bishop (d. 1183)
- Roger de Pont L'Évêque, Norman archbishop (d. 1181)
- Welf VI, margrave of Tuscany (House of Welf) (d. 1191)
- Wichmann von Seeburg, German archbishop (d. 1192)
- William V (the Old), marquis of Montferrat (d. 1191)

1116

- April 12 – Richeza of Poland, queen of Sweden (d. 1156)
- August 29 – Philip of France, king of France (d. 1131)
- November 23 – William FitzRobert, 2nd Earl of Gloucester (d. 1183)
- Berengaria of Barcelona, queen of León and Castile (d. 1149)
- Ibn Saad al-Khair al-Balancy, Arab Andalusian linguist and poet (d. 1175)
- Ibn al-Azraq al-Fariqi, Arab historian and writer (d. 1176)
- Ibn al-Jawzi, Arab historian and philologist (d. 1201)
- Ibn Mada', Arab scholar and polymath (d. 1196)
- Roger de Clare, 2nd Earl of Hertford (d. 1173)
- Ruaidrí Ua Conchobair, king of Connacht (d. 1198)

1117

- September 7 – Nicolò Politi, Italian hermit (d. 1167)
- Fujiwara no Nariko, Japanese empress (d. 1160)
- Gerard la Pucelle, bishop of Coventry (d. 1184)
- Henry I, count of Guelders and Zutphen (d. 1182)
- Humphrey II of Toron, constable of Jerusalem (d. 1179)
- Maurice of Carnoet, French Cistercian abbot (d. 1191)
- Otto I (the Redhead), duke of Bavaria (d. 1183)
- Robert FitzRanulph, English high sheriff (d. 1172)
- Simon III de Montfort, French nobleman (d. 1181)

1118

- November 28 – Manuel I Komnenos, Byzantine emperor (d. 1180)
- Ahmad al-Rifa'i, Arab founder of the Rifa'i Sufi Order
- Andronikos I Komnenos, Byzantine emperor (d. 1185)
- Christina of Denmark, queen of Norway (approximate date)
- Gualdim Pais, Portuguese knight and Grand Master (d. 1195)
- Hartwig of Stade, archbishop of Bremen (d. 1168)
- Narathu, Burmese ruler of the Pagan Kingdom (d. 1171)
- Nur ad-Din, Seljuk ruler of Damascus and Aleppo (d. 1174)
- Odo II, French nobleman (House of Burgundy) (d. 1162)
- Roger III, Norman duke of Apulia and Calabria (d. 1148)
- Roger of Worcester, English bishop (approximate date)
- Saigyō Hōshi, Japanese poet and writer (d. 1190)
- Taira no Kiyomori, Japanese military leader (d. 1181)
- Vakhtang (or Tsuata), Georgian nobleman (d. 1138)

1119

- February 28 – Xi Zong, Chinese emperor (d. 1150)
- July 7 – Sutoku, Japanese emperor (d. 1164)
- Ahmed-Al-Kabeer, Arab Sufi teacher (d. 1182)
- Aldebrandus, bishop of Fossombrone (d. 1219)
- Matthias I, duke of Lorraine (approximate date)
- Tancred, Norman nobleman (approximate date)
- William de Warenne, 3rd Earl of Surrey (d. 1148)

== Deaths ==
1110

- July 10 – Elias I, Count of Maine (de Baugency), French nobleman
- November 12 – Gebhard III, bishop of Constance
- Lhachen Utpala, Indian king of Ladakh (b. 1080)
- Li Jie, Chinese writer of the Song dynasty (b. 1065)
- Richard of Hauteville, Italo-Norman nobleman
- Robert Scalio of Hauteville, Italo-Norman nobleman
- Thiofrid, Benedictine abbot of Echternach
- Vijayabahu I, Sri Lankan king of Polonnaruwa
- William Bona Anima, archbishop of Rouen

1111

- January 29 – Piotr I (or Peter), bishop of Wrocław
- February 22 – Roger Borsa, Italo-Norman nobleman
- March 3 – Bohemond I, Italo-Norman nobleman (b. 1054)
- April 12 – Berthold II, German nobleman (b. 1050)
- April 17 – Robert of Molesme, French abbot (b. 1028)
- June 15 – Yun Kwan, Korean general (b. 1040)
- September 27 – Vekenega, Croatian abbess
- October 5 – Robert II, Count of Flanders (b. 1065)
- October 7 – Anna Polovetskaya, Kievan princess
- October 26 – Gómez González, Castilian nobleman
- November 8 – Otto II, German nobleman
- December 19
  - Agnes of Rheinfelden, German noblewoman
  - Al-Ghazali, Persian theologian (b. 1058)
- Cadwgan ap Bleddyn, Prince of Powys (b. 1051)
- Iorwerth ap Bleddyn, Prince of Powys (b. 1053)
- Ōe no Masafusa, Japanese poet and writer (b. 1041)
- Richard II, Italian consul and Duke of Gaeta

1112

- Easter – Waldric, English Lord Chancellor and Bishop of Laon, murdered (b. 1050)
- May 13 – Ulric II (or Udalrich), Italian nobleman
- October 5 – Sigebert of Gembloux, French chronicler
- October 12 – Kogh Vasil ("the Robber"), Armenian ruler
- November 3 – Anna Vsevolodovna, Kievan princess
- Baldric of Noyon, bishop of Tournai (b. 1099)
- Bertrand of Tripoli, count of Toulouse and Tripoli
- Elimar I (or Egilmar), count of Oldenburg (b. 1040)
- Fakhr-un-Nisa, Arab scholar and calligrapher
- George II (or Giorgi), king of Georgia (b. 1054)
- Ghibbelin (or Gibelin), archbishop of Arles
- Henry (or Henri), count of Portugal (b. 1066)
- Kyansittha, king of the Pagan Empire (or 1113)
- Su Zhe, Chinese politician and historian (b. 1039)
- Tancred, Italo-Norman nobleman (b. 1075)
- Vukan I, Grand Prince of Serbia (b. 1050)

1113

- January 5 – Ulrich I, Moravian ruler (House of Přemyslid)
- April 13 – Ida of Lorraine, French countess (b. 1040)
- April 16 – Sviatopolk II, Grand Prince of Kiev (b. 1050)
- August 4 – Gertrude of Saxony, countess of Holland
- October 2 – Mawdud ibn Altuntash, Turkic governor
- December 10 – Fakhr al-Mulk Radwan, Seljuk ruler
- Dharanindravarman I, king of the Khmer Empire
- Girard I (or Guinard), count of Roussillon (b. 1070)
- Ibn Tahir of Caesarea, Arab historian (b. 1056)
- Kyansittha, king of the Pagan Empire (or 1112)
- Liu, Chinese empress of the Song dynasty (b. 1079)
- Nestor the Chronicler, Russian historian (or 1114)
- Odo of Tournai, bishop of Cambrai (b. 1060)
- Syr ibn Abi Bakr, Almoravid military leader
- Wuyashu, chieftain of the Wanyan tribe (b. 1061)

1114

- February 24 – Thomas II, archbishop of York
- October – Abu Ishaq Ibrahim ibn Ahmad al-Mustazhir, was the son of Abbasid caliph al-Mustazhir and Ismah.
- Abu al-Mu'in al-Nasafi, Arab theologian (or 1115)
- Álvar Fáñez (or Háñez), Castilian nobleman
- Alypius of the Caves, Kievan monk and painter
- Erard I, French nobleman and crusader (b. 1060)
- Nestor the Chronicler, Kievan historian (or 1113)
- Richard of Salerno, Norman nobleman (b. 1060)
- Shahriyar IV, king of Mazandaran (b. 1039)
- Tokushi, Japanese empress consort (b. 1060)

1115

- 16 May – Lambert of Arras, Flemish bishop
- July 8 – Peter the Hermit, French religious leader
- July 24 – Matilda, margravine of Tuscany (b. 1046)
- September 27 – Bonfilius, Italian Saint and bishop of Foligno
- December 22 – Olav Magnusson, king of Norway (b. 1099)
- December 23 – Ivo of Chartres, French bishop (b. 1040)
- December 30 – Theodoric II, duke of Lorraine
- Abu al-Mu'in al-Nasafi, Arab theologian (or 1114)
- Adela of Flanders, queen of Denmark (b. 1064)
- Artau II, count of Pallars Sobirà (approximate date)
- Eight Deer Jaguar Claw, Mixtec ruler (b. 1063)
- Gerberga (or Gerburge), countess of Provence
- Godfrey of Amiens, French bishop (b. 1066)
- Leo Marsicanus, Italian cardinal (b. 1046)
- Mazdali ibn Tilankan, Almoravid governor
- Odo II (or Eudes), count of Champagne
- Reynelm (or Reinelm), bishop of Hereford
- Shin Arahan, Burmese religious adviser
- Tanchelm of Antwerp, Flemish priest
- Turgot of Durham, Scottish bishop

1116

- February 3 – Coloman (the Learned), king of Hungary
- February 13 – Galon (or Gallo), bishop of Beauvais
- Abu Nasr Farsi, Persian statesman and poet (or 1117)
- Bagrat Pakrad, Armenian nobleman and adventurer
- Jimena Díaz, Spanish noblewoman (approximate date)
- Malik Shah, Seljuk ruler of the Sultanate of Rum
- Mary of Scotland, countess of Boulogne (b. 1082)
- Robert of Arbrissel, founder of Fontevrault Abbey

1117

- February 14 – Bertrade de Montfort, French queen (b. 1070)
- April 11 – Tescelin le Roux, Burgundian nobleman (b. 1070)
- April 14 – Bernard of Thiron, founder of the Order of Tiron (b. 1046)
- April 16 – Magnus Erlendsson, Norse earl of Orkney (b. 1080)
- September 1 – Robert de Limesey, bishop of Coventry
- December 9 – Gertrud of Brunswick, margravine of Meissen
- Abu'l-Fath Yusuf, Persian vizier of Arslan-Shah of Ghazna
- Abu Nasr Farsi, Persian statesman and poet (or 1116)
- Anselm of Laon (or Ansel), French theologian and writer
- Danxia Zichun, Chinese Zen Buddhist monk (b. 1064)
- Faritius (or Faricius), Italian abbot and physician
- Gertrude of Flanders, duchess of Lorraine (b. 1070)
- Gilbert Crispin, Norman abbot and theologian (b. 1055)
- Gilbert Fitz Richard, English nobleman (b. 1066)
- Lu'lu' al-Yaya, Seljuk ruler and regent of Aleppo
- Ordelafo Faliero (or Dodoni), doge of Venice

1118

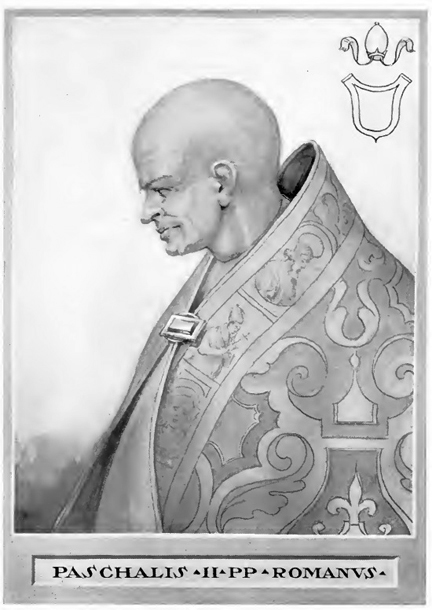
Pope Paschal II d. January 21, 1118

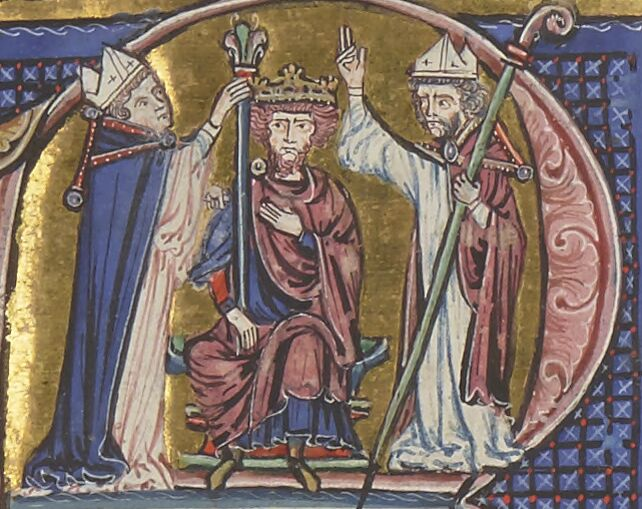
Baldwin I of Jerusalem d. April 2, 1118

- January 21 – Paschal II, pope of the Catholic Church
- April 2 – Baldwin I (of Boulogne), king of Jerusalem
- April 16
  - Adelaide del Vasto, countess of Sicily
  - William d'Évreux, Norman nobleman
- May 1 – Matilda of Scotland, queen of England (b. c.1080)
- June 5 – Robert de Beaumont, 1st Earl of Leicester
- July 3 – Raymond of Toulouse, French chanter
- August 6 – Al-Mustazhir, Abbasid caliph (b. 1078)
- August 15 – Alexios I Komnenos, Byzantine emperor
- November 28 – Philippa, French noblewoman
- Al-Tighnari, Arab botanist and physician (b. 1073)
- Anseau of Garlande, French nobleman (b. 1069)
- Arnulf of Chocques, patriarch of Jerusalem
- Arslan-Shah, sultan of the Ghaznavid Empire
- Basil the Physician, Bogomil religious leader
- Bernard II (or William), count of Cerdanya
- Diarmait Ua Briain, king of Munster
- Florence of Worcester, English monk
- Fujiwara no Nakazane, Japanese nobleman (b. 1057)
- Furong Daokai, Chinese Buddhist monk (b. 1043)
- George of Chqondidi, Georgian archbishop
- Gissur Ísleifsson, Icelandic bishop
- Helperich, margrave of the Nordmark
- Hugh I, French nobleman (b. 1040)
- Jaquinta of Bari, queen of Duklja
- Lidanus, Lombard Benedictine abbot (b. 1026)
- Maria of Alania, Byzantine empress (b. 1053)
- Milo II of Montlhéry, French nobleman
- Muhammad I (Tapar), Seljuk sultan (b. 1082)
- Philip, king of Sweden (House of Stenkil)
- Ruaidrí na Saide Buide, king of Connacht
- Vladimir II, king of Duklja (approximate date)
- William V of Angoulême, French nobleman

1119

- January 29 – Gelasius II, pope of the Catholic Church
- March 10 – Muirchertach Ua Briain, king of Munster
- March 29 – Peter de Honestis, Lombard monk
- June 20 – Henry de Beaumont, 1st Earl of Warwick
- June 27 – Herwig of Meissen, German bishop
- June 28 – Roger of Salerno, Norman nobleman
- July 17 – Baldwin VII, count of Flanders (b. 1093)
- July 22 – Herbert de Losinga, English bishop
- August 4 – Landulf II, archbishop of Benevento
- September 13 – Gleb Vseslavich, Kievan prince
- October 13 – Alan IV, duke of Brittany (b. 1063)
- Aedh Ua Con Ceannainn, king of Uí Díarmata
- Geoffrey de Clyve (de Clive), English bishop
- Ibn Aqil, Persian theologian and jurist (b. 1040)
- Johannes of Jerusalem, French abbot (b. 1042)
- Robert the Leper (Leprous), French nobleman
- Wang Ximeng, Chinese painter (b. 1096)
