= Battle of Almodóvar del Río =

Battle of Almodóvar del Río (1091)
- Part of Reconquista
Date	June 1091
Location	Almodóvar del Río 37°48′N 5°01′W
Result	Almoravid victory

Belligerents
Almoravid dynasty	Kingdom of Castile; Taifa of Seville

Commanders and leaders
Ibrahim bin Ishaq Al-Lamtuni	Álvar Fáñez (WIA)

Strength
Muslim sources: 10,000 men Christian sources: 15,000 men	Muslim sources: 20,000 knights 40,000 infantry Christian sources: 2,500 knights

Casualties and losses
Heavy	Heavy

The battle of Almodóvar del Río was a military engagement between the Almoravids and the Castilian forces who attempted to relieve Seville. The Castilians were defeated and routed.

== History ==
In May 1091, the Almoravids, led by Syr ibn Abi Bakr began a siege of the city of Seville which was ruled by the Taifa king, Al-Mu'tamid ibn Abbad. As a part of the defense plan for the city, Al-Mu'tamid called for help from the Castilian-Leonese king, Alfonso VI. Stunned by the Almoravid invasion, Alfonso and Al-Mu'tamid had the mutual goal of relieving the siege of Seville and stopping the Almoravid invasion. In June, Alfonso sent a relief force to Seville led by one of his leading generals, Álvar Fáñez.

Muslim accounts state that the Castilian force had a force of 20,000 cavalry and 40,000 infantry, while Christian sources state that the Castilian force consisted of only 2,500 knights. The Almoravid general, realizing what was happening, dispatched a force of 10,000 men led by Ibrahim bin Ishaq Al-Lamtuni, which the Christian chronicles state had 15,000 men. Both sides met at the site of Almodóvar del Río. A fierce battle ensued, and both sides sustained heavy losses. The battle ended in Almoravid victory and the route of the Casilitans. Álvar Fáñez was wounded during the battle and retreated from the battlefield to Toledo.

The battle buried any hopes to save Al-Mu'tamid and Seville, which would fall in September.

== Sources ==
- Enan, Muhammad Abdullah (1960). The State of Islam in Andalusia: The Taifa states (PDF) (in Arabic). Vol. II.
- Medeiros, Decio Martins de (2024-11-25). El Cid: Illustrated Edition. Decio Martins de Medeiros.
- Cayuelas, Antonio Gómez (2021-11-10). El Cid. La forja y el milagro (in Spanish). Adarve. ISBN 978-84-18958-51-9.
