= Siege of Nicaea (disambiguation) =

The Siege of Nicaea took place in 1097 as part of the First Crusade.

Siege of Nicaea may also refer to:

- Siege of Nicaea (727), part of the Arab–Byzantine Wars
- Siege of Nicaea (1113), part of the Byzantine–Seljuk Wars
- Siege of Nicaea (1328–1331), part of the Byzantine–Ottoman Wars
