= Almoravid campaign in central Iberia (1109–1110) =

1109–1110 invasion of Toledo by the Almoravids

- Part of the Reconquista
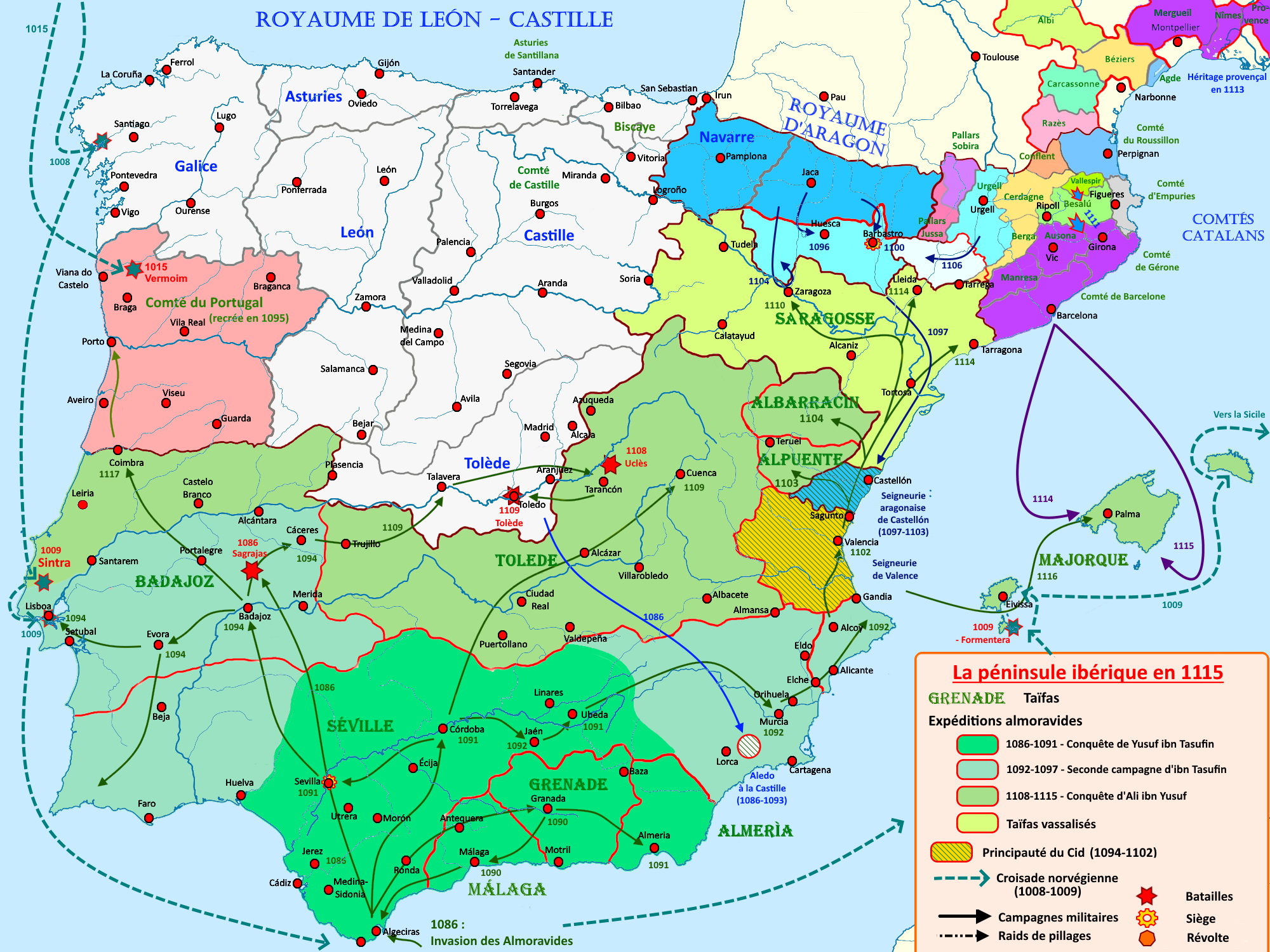
- Iberian Peninsula in 1115
Date	14 August 1109 – 1110
Location	Kingdom of Toledo
Result	Almoravid victory
Territorial changes	Almoravid conquest of Talavera de la Reina, Madrid, and Guadalajara.

Belligerents
Almoravid dynasty	Kingdom of Castile

Commanders and leaders
Ali ibn Yusuf	Álvar Fáñez

Strength
Unknown	Unknown

Casualties and losses
Heavy	Heavy

In the year 1109, the Almoravid leader Ali ibn Yusuf launched a campaign against the Kingdom of Castile. During the campaign, they captured Talavera and other towns and forts. but they failed to capture Toledo.

== Prelude ==
After two months passed since the Battle of Uclés, the Almoravid leader, Ali bin Yusuf, set sail to Andalusia in August. He left Ceuta with a large army and crossed the straits. He arrived in Cordoba, where he stayed for one month before beginning his campaign.

== Campaign ==
According to Muslim accounts, the Almoravids first went to Talavera de la Reina, which was situated on the Tagus River west of Toledo. The Almoravids assaulted the town and sacked it, killing or enslaving the inhabitants. The Almoravids also freed Muslim prisoners. The Christians who survived the onslaught escaped to the Kasbah. The Christians managed to escape the Kasbah, which allowed the Almoravids to capture it. The city was sacked, and its church was returned as a mosque. Ali then established a strong garrison. The Almoravids then invaded the Toledo vicinity, assaulting and capturing 27 forts. They also captured Madrid and Guadalajara. They then invested in Toledo, but after a siege of three days, they retreated after ravaging its vicinity.

Christian accounts, however, present different versions. The Almoravids first went to Toledo; they destroyed the castles of San Servando and Aceca. They then invested in Toledo. The city was defended Álvar Fáñez. The siege has lasted for seven days, during which the Castilians managed to repel the Almoravids attempts to capture the city, suffering heavy losses and many siege equipments in 1110. After the failed siege, the Almoravids assaulted and sacked Madrid, Talavera, Olmos, Canales, and many other towns, carrying a large number of prisoners and plunder.

After the campaign, Ali returned to Cordoba, then to Marrakesh. Despite the difference in both accounts, it agrees that the campaign was large and had effect on the Castilians.

== Sources ==
- Muhammad Abdullah Enan, The State of Islam in Andalusia, Vol. III: The Era of Almoravids and Almohads, Part 1.
- Ronald A. Messier (2010), The Almoravids and the Meanings of Jihad.
- Richard Fletcher & Simon Barton (2000), The World of El Cid: Chronicles of the Spanish Reconquest.
