= Battles and sieges of Lisbon =

The battles and sieges of Lisbon include:

- Sack of Lisbon (798), by Alfonso II of Asturias
- Siege of Lisbon (844), part of the Viking raid on Seville
- Sack of Lisbon (953), by Ordoño III of Leon
- Capture of Lisbon (1094), by the Almoravids
- Siege of Lisbon (1109), part of the Reconquista and the Norwegian Crusade
- Siege of Lisbon (1142), part of the Reconquista
- Siege of Lisbon (1147), part of the Second Crusade
- Battle of Lisbon (1373), part of the Second Fernandine War
- Siege of Lisbon (1384), during the 1383–1385 Portuguese interregnum
- Battle of Alfarrobeira (1449), between the forces of King Afonso V and the rebellious Duke of Coimbra
- Battle of Alcântara (1580) part of the War of the Portuguese Succession
- Battle of Vimeiro (1808), part of the Peninsular War
