= Mazdali ibn Tilankan =

Mazdali ibn Tilankan أبو محمد مزدلي بن تيلانكان

Governor of Tlemcen
- In office 1102–1106
- Monarch: Yusuf ibn Tashfin
- Preceded by: Tashfin ibn Tinaghmar

Governor of Cordoba
- In office 1091–1106
- Monarch: Yusuf ibn Tashfin
- Preceded by: Abu Nasr al-Fath al-Ma'mūn ibn Al-Mu'tamid ibn Abbad (Taifa of Seville)
- Succeeded by: Muhammad ibn Mazdali

Governor of Cordoba, Granada, and Almeria
- In office 1111–1115
- Monarch: Ali ibn Yusuf

Personal details
- Died: March 1115
- Parent: Tilankan ibn Hamid (father)

Military service
- Allegiance: Almoravid empire
- Rank: Commander; Governor of Tlemcen; Governor of Cordoba; Governor of Granada, Cordoba and Almeria

Abu Muhammad Mazdali ibn Tilankan (Arabic: أبو محمد مزدلي بن تيلانكان) (died March 1115) was a Berber military commander and diplomat for the Almoravid empire. Once Yusuf ibn Tashfin decided to become independent, he chose Mazdali, his second cousin and made him one of his most effective collaborators, to subdue and pacify the Maghrib and al-Andalus.

== Biography ==
Mazdali belonged to the Banu Turgut clan of the Lamtuna, a Berber tribe belonging to the Sanhaja confederation. His grandfather Hamid and Ibn Tashfin’s grandfather Ibrahim were brothers.

=== Under Yusuf ibn Tashfin ===
After the foundation of Marrakesh, ibn Tashfin sent Mazdali in 1073, at the head of an army, to the region of Salé, whose tribes he submitted, without struggle or siege. Satisfied with this result, Yusuf put him, two years later, in 1075, at the head of another army which also subjected Tlemcen without resistance and deposed its ruler, the emir al-'Abbas ibn Yahya al-Zanati.

In 1076, Mazdali was to perform, a sensitive diplomatic mission. Ibrahim, son of Abu Bakr ibn Umar and governor of Sijilmasa, came to Aghmat to claim the power from which his father had been dispossessed. As soon as he heard it, Yusuf sent Mazdali, who met with Ibrahim. By his skill, Mazdali unraveled the crisis, dissuading Ibrahim from maintaining his claims. He offered him presents that he accepted, as his father had done, and returned him to the Sahara. Under the order of Ibn tashfin in 1079, some 20,000 Almoravid soldiers were sent, under the command of Ibn Tilankan. The Almoravid forces marched up the Moulouya valley, where they faced the enemy, an armed force from the Bani Ya'la, somewhere between the Moulouya river and the Za river. Mazdali crushed the Zanata enemies and executed Mali ibn Ya‘la, amir of Tlemcen's son. Nevertheless, Mazdali did not choose to conquer Tlemcen, because between him and Tlemcen stood the powerful tribe Bani Iznasan who held the town of Oujda. Then, Ibn Tilankan went back to Marrakesh to announce his victory. In 1091, Yusuf ibn Tashfin appoints him Governor of Cordova, taken on 27 March. Little is known about the activity of Mazdali for ten years, before finding him in the early spring of 1102 at the head of an army that besieged Valencia successfully. Valencia was ruled by El Cid's widow, Jimena Díaz, after his death on 10 July 1099. She appealed to King Alfonso VI for help, but he came merely to provide her and other people haven in his capital Toledo.

Yusuf decided, in the same year, 1102, to appoint him governor of Tlemcen, with full power to resolve the conflict existing between the previous governor, Tashfin ibn Tinaghmar and the Emir of Bougie, who were making war on one another. Mazdali managed to reconcile the Emir of Bougie, Al Mansur with the power of Almoravids and remained in the governorate of Tlemcen, until the death of Yusuf ibn Tashfin in 1106.

=== Under Ali ibn Yusuf ===
He then went to Marrakech, to take an oath to the new Amir Ali ibn Yusuf, passing through Fez where he advised Yahya ibn Abi Bakr, nephew of Ali, to give up his pretensions to the throne. In 1111, he was appointed governor of Granada. He attached to his jurisdiction the provinces of Cordoba and Almeria, then set up an expedition against Guadalajara, which he attacked the following year in 1112, without succeeding in taking it. He raided its surroundings and returned to Cordoba, laden with booty. But his enemies accused him of negligence with Ali ibn Yusuf. He was dismissed and transferred to Marrakesh, where he must justify himself to the Amir. Cleared of these accusations, he was restored to the governorate of Granada and Cordoba. He crosses the Straits, goes to Seville and with the assistance of Syr ibn Abi Bakr and the armies of Granada and Cordoba, he began a retaliatory raid on Toledo.

In July 1114, Mazdali attacks La Sagra, ransacking Peginas, Cabanas and Magan; he routed the following month Rodrigue Aznar at Polgar. But he had to fall on the battlefield in March 1115, fighting Castilians near Mastasa, a day north of Cordoba. His body was brought back to Cordoba the next day.

== Sources ==
Lagardère, Vincent (1978). "Le gouvernorat des villes et la suprématie des Banu Turgut au Maroc et en Andalus de 477/1075 à 500/1106". Revue de l'Occident musulman et de la Méditerranée (in French). 25 (1): 49–65. doi:10.3406/remmm.1978.1803. ISSN 0035-1474.

Messier, Ronald A. (2010). The Almoravids and the Meanings of Jihad. ABC-CLIO. ISBN 9780313385896.
