= Al-Rumaikiyya =

Andalusian poet, wife of King Motamid of Seville, Arabic poet

- اعتماد الرميكية
- Born: c. 1045-1047; Al-Andalus
- Died: Aghmat
- Occupation: Poet
- Spouse: Al-Mu'tamid ibn Abbad
- Children: Abbad, Arradi, Al-Ma'maún, Rashid, Al-Motab, Abu Hashem, Buthaina
- Writing career
- Language: Arabic
- Period: 11th century
- Genre: Poetry

E'etemad al-Rumaikiyya (Arabic: اعتماد الرميكية) was an Andalusian poet, consort of Emir Al-Mu'tamid of Seville. She is believed to have been born between 1045 and 1047.

== Biography ==
She was of humble origin and was servant (slave) to a Moor of Seville named Jachach, who employed her in driving beasts of burden. One day, the future king met her in the street and was so impressed by her abilities and beauty that he at once removed her and made her his wife. This was greatly displeasing to the prince’s father, Emir Al-Mu'tadid, who however was soon captivated by Al-Rumaikiyya, especially after she had given him a grandson.

Despite her lowly background, Al-Rumaikiyya carried out her duties as consort wonderfully well, according to descriptions. It has also been said that she loved her husband dearly, matching Al-Mu'tamid’s love for her. When her husband succeeded to the throne, he is said to have complied with every whim of his wife, to the extent that his subjects could not stop themselves expressing their dissatisfaction. This mutual passion between husband and wife led each to compose inspired and deeply felt poetry for the other, although only one poem of Al-Rumaikiyya’s remains to us.

It is evident that the she was not occupied solely in indulging her caprices and writing poems. An inscription kept in the Museum of Seville shows that it was she who caused the tower to be built at the mosque that once occupied the present site of the Church of San Juan de la Palma; indeed the mosque as a whole may have been her work.

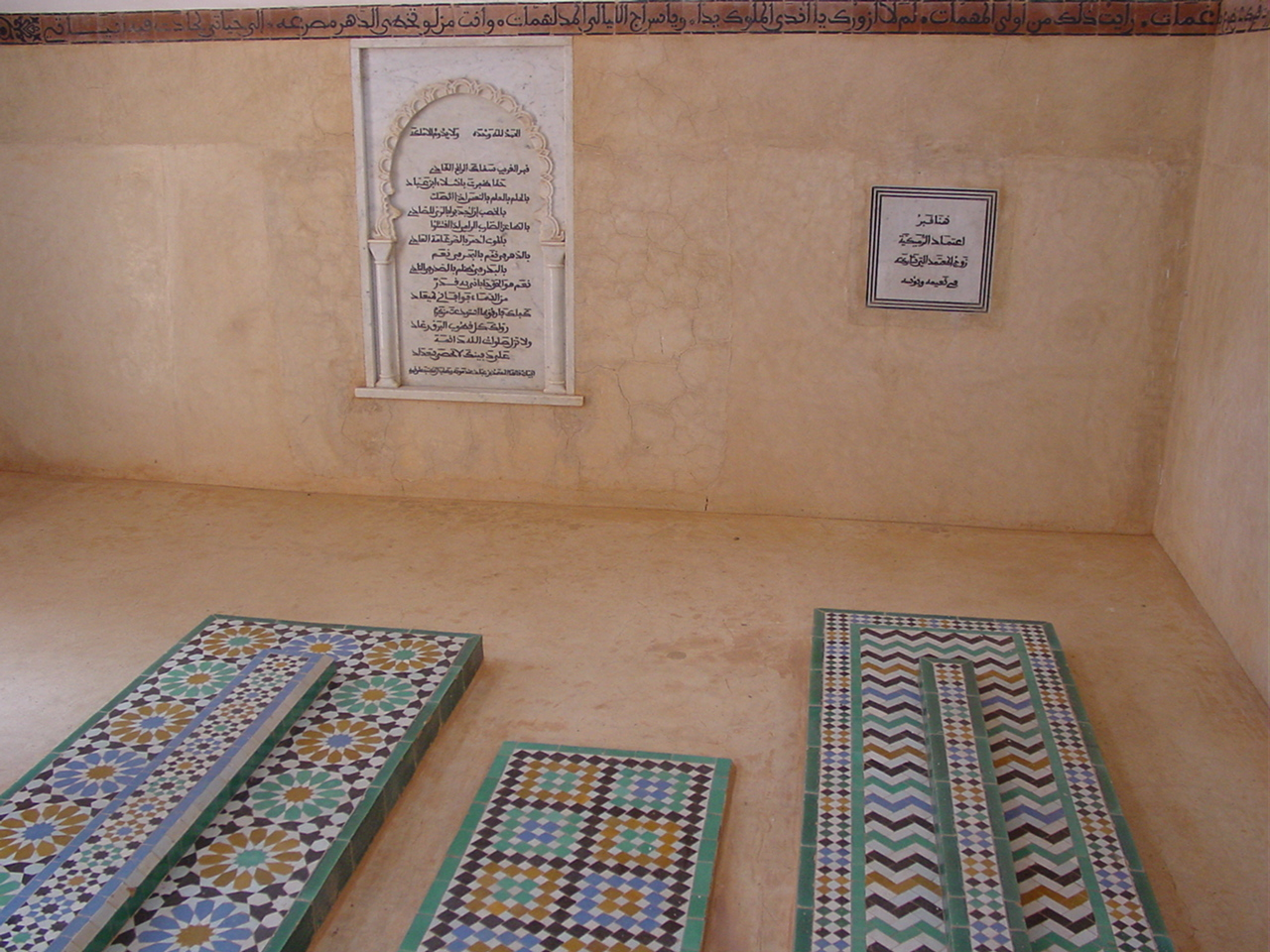
Tomb of Al-Mu'tamid along with his wife Al-Rumaikiyya in Aghmat

After Al-Mu'tamid was dethroned by Yusuf ibn Tashfin in 1091, she with her husband and children were taken to a fort at Aghmat, where she is thought to have died. Her misfortune was mourned by her contemporaries.

=== Children and descendants ===
- Prince Abbad. Died in battle.
- Prince Arradi. Died in battle.
- Prince Al-Ma'maún. Died in battle.
- Prince Rashid. Crown Prince of the Taifa of Seville.
- Prince Al-Motab.
- Prince Abu Hashem.
- Princess Buthaina. Poet.

== In legend ==
The relationship of the King of Seville with Rumaikiyya was the source of many stories, one of them being the following famous Spanish story:

One day, the earl spoke with his counselor as follows:

"Patronio, look what happens with a man: he often asks me to help and succor him some money; but every time I do so, he gives me tokens of appreciation, but if he is not happy with the money I give, he is unhappy and seems to have forgotten the favors I've done to him earlier. As I know your judgment, please let me your advice on how to behave with that man."

"My lord, I think, that what happens between you and this man is the same thing that happened to King Al-Motamid of Seville with Al-Rumaikiyya, his wife."

The count asked what had happened.

"My lord, the king Al-Motamid was married to Al-Rumaikiyya, and loved her more than anyone in the world. She was very good and the Saracens still remembered her for her words and deeds, which are exemplary. But sometimes, she was a whimsical and capricious woman.

"It happened that one day, in Córdoba in the month of February, snow fell and when Al-Rumaikiyya saw snow, she began to mourn. The king asked why she was crying, and she told him she was crying because he never let her go to the places where it snowed. The king, to please her, because Córdoba is a city of warm temperature and there is rarely snow, planted almond trees sent from the mountains above Córdoba so that when they bloomed in February, they appeared to be covered with snow and the queen saw her desire fulfilled.

"And again, while Al-Rumaikiyya was in her room, which was next to the river, she saw a barefoot woman who collected mud to make bricks. And when she saw this the queen began to mourn. The king asked her why she was crying, and she said she could never do what she wanted, unlike that humble woman. The king, to please her, sent for rosewater to fill a large lake in Córdoba; then ordered that the land taken out of the lake should be filled with sugar, cinnamon, lavender, clove, musk, amber and civet, and a number of spices that smell good. When the lake was full of all these things and the mud was as you can imagine, the king told his wife to take off her shoes and step out, and then she could make mud bricks all she wanted.

"Again, she was craving something else, and she began to mourn. The king asked why she was crying, and she replied that she would not mourn if he ever did anything to please her. The good king, seeing that she did not appreciate all that he had done for her, not knowing what else he could do, he said these words in Arabic: "Not even the day you played with mud?" for her to understand that by the mud she should always remember that he had tried his best to satisfy her.

"And so, my lord, if that man forgets, and does not thank you for all you've done for him, simply because you have not done as he would like, I advise you not to do anything to harm him. And I also advise that if someone did a favor for you, but then does not do everything you want, do not forget the good that person has done to you."

To the count this seemed good advice, and he followed it and did very well.
