= Capture of Santarém (1111) =

Almoravid campaign in County of Portugal

- Part of Reconquista
Date	25–26 May 1111
Location	Santarém, Portugal 39°14′02″N 08°41′10″W
Result	Almoravid victory

Belligerents
Almoravid dynasty	County of Portugal

Commanders and leaders
Syr ibn Abi Bakr; Abi Muhammad Abdul Majid bin 'Abdoun	Henry, Count of Portugal

Strength
Unknown	Unknown

Casualties and losses
Unknown	Unknown

In 1111, the Almoravids launched a campaign into the County of Portugal, capturing Santarém and expanding their control over western Iberia.

The campaign was led by Syr ibn Abi Bakr, the Almoravid governor of Al-Andalus, who advanced into Portuguese territory and captured Santarém on 25 or 26 May 1111. The conquest forced Henry, Count of Portugal, to retreat and strengthened Almoravid control over the western territories of the Iberian Peninsula.

== Background ==
After the fall of Toledo to Alfonso VI of León and Castile in 1085, the rulers of the taifas of Seville, Badajoz and Granada petitioned Yusuf ibn Tashfin, the Almoravid emir to enter al-Andalus as an ally to stop the expansion of the Christians. In 1086, Tashfin and the taifa kingdoms defeated Alfonso VI at the Battle of Sagrajas, but by 1090 the Muslim alliance had fallen apart and the Almoravids had begun a campaign to take control of the taifa kingdoms.

In 1093 after the Almoravids had taken control of Granada, Málaga, and Seville, the ruler of Badajoz, Umar al-Mutawakki, who had been attempting to maintain a neutral position between the Christians and the Almoravids, allied with Alfonso VI for protection and in return ceded the cities of Lisbon, Sintra, and Santarém to the Christians. This alliance, however, did not save Badajoz from the Almoravids, as they took control of the taifa in 1094 along with Lisbon and Sintra and executed al-Mutawakki and his son.

In 1096, Alfonso VI expanded the County of Portugal to the border of the Almoravid Badajoz territory and named his son-in-law, Henry of Burgandy as the Count of Portugal. Between 1096 and 1110, Count Henry asserted informal control over much of the territory by building a defensive network including the establishment of a garrison at Santarém. With this military structure, Henry conducted raids on the Almoravids and challenged their authority. By 1111, the Almoravids were ready to respond in force.

== The capture ==
In 1111, the Almoravids, led by general Syr ibn Abi Bakr, the governor of Seville campaigned against the Portuguese capturing Evora, Lisbon and Sintra.^{[a]} Abi Bakr then moved against the heavily fortified city of Santarém. The city was besieged and ultimately the Almoravids stormed the city walls, killing many of the garrison. On the 25/26th of May the city surrendered. According to the Almoravid Vizier Abi Muhammad Abdul Majid bin 'Abdoun, the Almoravids captured the city due to fortune; otherwise, they would have failed in their effort.

After the surrender of Santarém, the Almoravids pushed Count Henry's forces back and raided as far as Coimbra.

== Notes ==
^{[a]} These cities were occupied by the Almoravids in 1093–4, which suggests fluctuating borders between the Almoravids and the Christians.
