= Zhang Congzheng =

Chinese physician and writer (1156–1228)

Zhang Congzheng (Chinese: 張從正; pinyin: Zhāng Cóngzhèng; 1156–1228), courtesy name Zihe (Chinese: 子和; pinyin: Zihé), was a Chinese physician and writer active during the Jin dynasty. Based in the capital city of Daliang (大梁; present-day Kaifeng, Henan), Zhang was known for his aggressive and unorthodox approach to medicine, which was based on the belief that all illnesses were caused by "deviant" qi. He is regarded as one of the "Four Great Masters" of the Jin-Yuan period.

== Views and practices ==
=== General views ===
Controversially, Zhang attributed all sicknesses to "deviant" qi. Writing in Rumen shiqin (儒门事亲), (Note: Translated into English as Confucians Serve Their Parents or Scholar Serving His Kin.) which was edited by his friend Ma Jiuchou, Zhang recommends three methods for ridding the body of deviant qi, namely purging (for lower body qi), sweating (for "pathogenic" qi near the epidermis), and vomiting (for upper body blockages). Zhang also approved of acupuncture and moxibustion. However, he was cautious about the use of pharmaceuticals, as opposed to "dietary stratagems". While Zhang likely never met his contemporary Liu Wansu, he was influenced by his writings, particularly with regard to the treatment of "wind disorders".

=== Differentiated treatments ===
Ming dynasty medical scholar Li Zhongji compared the distinct approaches of Zhang, who pioneered the gongxia pai (攻下派, literally "Attack and purge") school of thought, and Xue Ji, who advocated for wenbu pai (温补派, literally "Warming and restoring") remedies: "How could these two gentlemen's use of drugs be opposite but equally effective?" According to Li, Zhang's approach to medicine was more aggressive because he treated poor labourers who could "withstand his drastic purgatives". By contrast, Xue treated aristocrats whose bodies were comparatively weaker and therefore needed "restoratives" to strengthen their immune systems.

Zhang himself believed that patients from different parts of the country had to be treated differently: "Because the southern frontiers are hotter, it is appropriate to use bitter and cooling prescriptions to treat. The northern region is colder, so it is appropriate to use bitter and warming prescriptions to resolve." Elsewhere, he opined that those from the "central region" were most prone to spleen and stomach disorders because of their eating habits.

=== Childbirth ===
According to his case histories, Zhang treated a woman who was in mortal danger after her three midwives had exerted too much force on her, thereby killing the baby. He reportedly conducted an emergency delivery of the dead foetus using a makeshift device comprising a hook from a steelyard balance attached to a rope. In another case, Zhang diagnosed a married woman, who had for years dreamt of "intercourse with ghosts and deities", with an "overflow of yin" in the body which was preventing her from getting pregnant.

=== Insanity ===
Zhang is credited with being the first physician to theorise that insanity was caused by fire, heat, and mucus, and could be treated with emetics and laxatives, in addition to psychotherapy. Zhang noted, for instance, that people could develop mental illnesses after "(falling) off a horse" or "(dropping) into a well", because of "mucus-saliva that is acting up in the upper body" which could only be removed with therapeutic vomiting. In one recorded example, Zhang tied a "crazy" man, who had fallen off a horse, onto a rotating wheel; the "madness stopped completely" after the man vomited and had a few litres of cold water to drink.

== Personal life and legacy ==
Born in 1156, Zhang was based in the capital city of Daliang (大梁; present-day Kaifeng, Henan). He was homeschooled from a young age. Because of his unorthodox approach to medicine, he did not interact much with his fellow physicians. Zhang died in 1228.

In modern histories of medicine in China, Zhang is referred to as one of the Si dajia (四大家, literally "Four Great Masters") of the Jin-Yuan period, alongside Li Dongyuan, Liu Wansu, and Zhu Zhenheng. However, during the Ming and Qing dynasties, the "Four Great Masters" were understood to refer to Li, Liu, Zhu, and Zhang Ji (instead of Zhang Congzheng).
