= Tower of Álvar Fáñez =

- Torreón de Álvar Fáñez (Spanish)
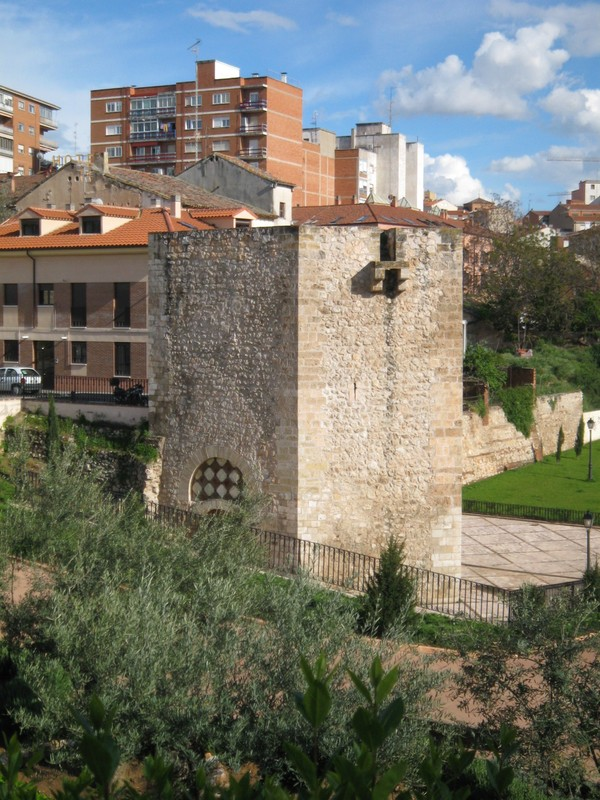

- Location within Spain
- 40.636389°N 3.168806°W
- Location: Guadalajara, Spain

Spanish Cultural Heritage
- Official name: Torreón de Álvar Fáñez
- Type: Non-movable
- Criteria: Monument
- Designated: 1921
- Reference no.: RI-51-0000193

The Tower of Álvar Fáñez (Spanish: Torreón de Álvar Fáñez) is a tower located in Guadalajara, Spain, which served as part of the city's medieval defences.

It is a pentagonal ashlar stone structure that measures up to 14 meters high with two distinct levels. Access to each floor is through arched openings which are located on different sides of the building, adapted to the sloping terrain. The rear facade (of the building) was intentionally left open to prevent enemies from establishing positions if they managed to capture the fortification.

It is named after Álvar Fáñez, known as the 'Conqueror of Guadalajara for Christianity', a Leonese nobleman and military leader who played a significant role in the Christian reconquest of Spain during the 11th century. He was a lieutenant of El Cid.

It also served as a chapel dedicated to the Christ of the Mass, known as the Cristo de la Feria.

The tower was declared Bien de Interés Cultural in 1921. It went under restoration in 1986 and also a complete refurbishment in 2004. The building now holds an exhibition centre dedicated to the origins of the city's coat of arms and also tales about the legend of Álvar Fáñez.

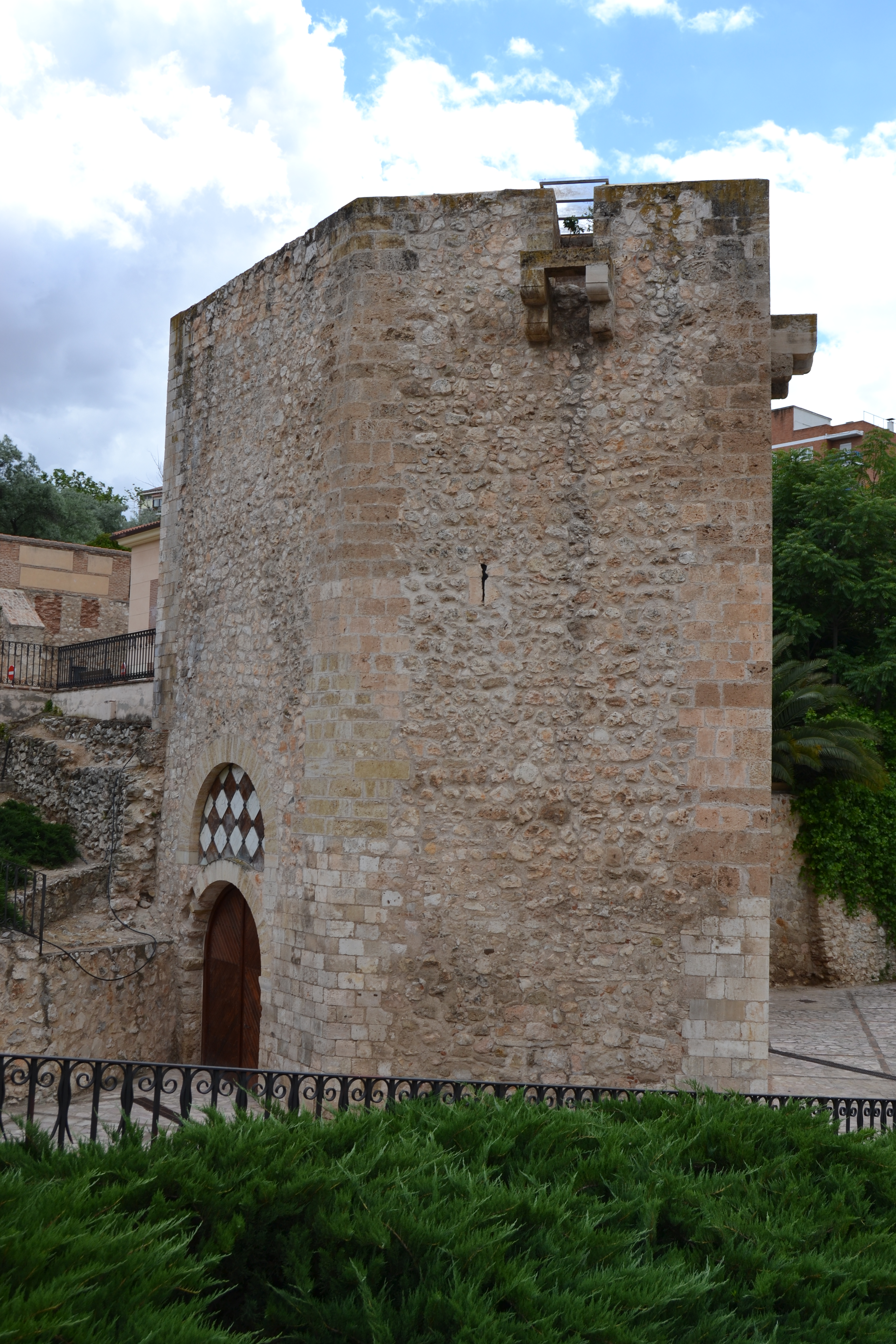
Torreón de Álvar Fáñez
