= Zhu Zhenheng =

Yuan dynasty physician and writer

Zhu Zhenheng (Chinese: 朱震亨; pinyin: Zhū Zhènhēng; 1282–1358), courtesy name Danxi (Chinese: 丹溪; pinyin: Dānxī), was a Chinese physician and writer active during the Yuan dynasty. Initially trained in classics as a fourth-generation follower of Confucian philosopher Zhu Xi, he decided to pursue a career in medicine after failing his civil examinations twice. After his death, Zhu's teachings continued to be compiled and circulated by his followers well into the Ming dynasty. In modern histories of medicine in imperial China, Zhu is referred to as one of the "four great masters of the Jin-Yuan scholarly medical tradition".

== Early life ==
Zhu was born in 1282 in Wuzhou (present-day Jinhua), Zhejiang. He was nicknamed "Danxi" (丹溪, literally "Cinnabar brook"), after a stream that he lived next to. Zhu's youth was "chivalrous though imprudent", and he failed the civil examinations in both 1317 and 1320, despite the fact that the examinations were largely based on the teachings of Confucian philosopher Zhu Xi, and Zhu Zhenheng was tutored by Xu Qian (许谦), a fourth-generation disciple of Zhu Xi. Perhaps at Xu Qian's urging, Zhu subsequently abandoned his classical studies and began focusing on medicine.

== Career ==
Zhu initially struggled to learn much about medicine, given that the physicians in Zhejiang whom he consulted lacked extensive knowledge. Furthermore, he found medical treatises like the Huangdi neijing too abstruse for him to understand on his own. In 1325, after traversing Zhejiang and the Yangtze Delta in search of a mentor, he became the protégé of Hangzhou physician Luo Zhiti (羅知悌), a second-generation follower of Liu Wansu who was also well-versed in the medical philosophies of Zhang Congzheng and Li Gao (李杲).

Integrating Luo's teachings with the Confucianism he had studied in his youth, Zhu returned to his hometown. His approach to medicine rested on the assumption that "yang is always in excess" and "yin is always deficient". Although he was still cognisant about the effect that external factors had on health, Zhu focused more on internal factors, with a particular emphasis on emotions. He believed that emotions contained "yang internal heat" which affected the yin in bodily fluids. Accordingly, his main stratagem was "Nourish yin and make Fire descend". Bearing in mind his mentor Luo's advice on "borrowing the best methods" from various specialists, Zhu took note of Li Gao's emphasis on digestive health and Zhang Congzheng's use of laxatives. At the same time, he made sure that he tailored his approach to best serve his patients who were "suffering from the damp heat of the Jiangnan climate".

As his reputation as both a physician and a teacher grew, Zhu began to take in more students, including his son Yuru (玉汝) and his nephew Sifan (嗣氾). In 1347, Zhu critiqued pharmacy in the Song dynasty in an essay titled Jufang fahui (局方发挥) or Exposé of Official Prescriptions. The same year, he wrote another essay that summarised his key medical beliefs, titled Gezhi yulun (格致餘論) or Further Views on Extending Knowledge.

In Gezhi yulun, possibly sharing Zhang Congzheng's views on insanity, Zhu argues that possession-like symptoms are typically "no more than confusion caused by mucus". Zhu offers the case study of a woman who seemingly became possessed after being admonished by her mother-in-law for sitting at the wrong place during a banquet. Against Zhu's advice, the woman's family invited several exorcists to cure her, although their rituals apparently caused her death soon after. According to Zhu's analysis, the banquet was held in the summer, thus much heat and mucus were trapped in the woman's body, leading to her erratic behaviour. The exorcists' chants "frightened her Spirit" and the ritual water sprinkled on her body caused it to cool down. She was therefore unable to sweat out the "muggy heat" in her body, which made her death inevitable.

Having thoroughly read Zhu Xi's Jiali (家禮, literally Family Rituals), Zhu was also an "expert on family ritual". He advised the Pujiang-based Zheng (鄭) family, which at the time comprised ten generations and a hundred-odd members all living in the same compound, on matters as funerals, sacrificial ceremonies, and weddings.

== Final years ==
Zhu died in 1358. After his death, Zhu's close associate Song Lian was commissioned by his family to author Zhu's biography. Writing in Gu Danxi xiansheng Zhu gong shibiaoci (故丹谿先生朱公石表辭), Song celebrates Zhu's maturation from an impetutous youth to a humble physician. He also recounts a few of Zhu's heroic exploits, such as his rescue of a Buddhist nun whose "demon-expelling idol of wood" had fallen into the wrong hands. At the end of his eulogy, Song praises Zhu's morality: "In the cultivation of purity and abstemiousness, he was able to do what others could not."

== Legacy ==
Apart from the two 1347 essays and a materia medica titled Bencao yanyi buyi (本草衍義補遺) that may not have been published in his lifetime, Zhu himself did not write much. Nevertheless, his teachings continued to flourish after his death. Reportedly Zhu's favourite student, Dai Yuanli (戴元禮; 1324–1405) served as Zhu Yuanzhang's court physician, a position that allowed him to share Zhu Zhenheng's teachings with other leading physicians of the Ming dynasty.

Moreover, a few hundred of Zhu's most notable case histories, which had been carefully compiled and preserved by his followers for two hundred years, were included in the Ming dynasty anthology Mingyi lei'an (名醫類案) or Classified Cases of Famous Doctors, first published in 1552. Zhu's doctrines, which infused cosmology and ethics into medicine, enjoyed much popularity during this period. Yet, by the end of the Ming dynasty, Zhu's teachings had become obscure, after being criticised by various medical advisors for its overemphasis on "draining Fire".

Regardless, in modern histories of medicine in imperial China, Zhu is referred to as one of the "four great masters of the Jin-Yuan scholarly medical tradition", alongside his predecessors Liu Wansu, Zhang Congzheng, and Li Gao.
