= Battle of Vatalandi =

Battle of Vatalandi (1110)
- Part of Reconquista
Date	1110
Location	Near Santarém, Portugal
Result	Almoravid victory

Belligerents
Almoravids	County of Portugal

Commanders and leaders
Syr ibn Abi Bakr	Soario Fromariges †; Mido Crescones †

Strength
Unknown	Unknown

Casualties and losses
Unknown	Heavy

The Battle of Vatalandi was a military engagement between the Almoravid troops and the Portuguese at Vatalandi, near Santarém. The Almoravids were victorious.

After the death of Alfonso VI of León and Castile, the Muslim inhabitants of Sintra, which was under Christian control, revolted in 1109. The Portuguese count, Henry quickly arrived and captured the castle, putting down the revolt. The next year, 1110, saw the Almoravid leader, Syr ibn Abi Bakr, subduing the Muslims west of Andalusia. The Almoravid forces had already crossed the Tagus River, making an entry to Extremadura. Henry, however, feared that the spirit of the rebellion would spread to other towns nearby that mutually assisted each other.

Seeing the Almoravid campaigning in Extremadura and fearing another rebellion, Count Henry sent troops to reinforce his important garrison of Santarém in early 1110. The Portuguese forces were under Soario Fromariges and Mido Crescones. The Portuguese marched carelessly, stopped at a place called Vatalandi, and made camp. The Almoravid force including Andalusians crossed the Tagus and attacked the small Portuguese contingent inflicting heavy damage and defeating them in a rout. The Portuguese commanders, Soario and Mido were killed in the battle.

The location of Vatalandi remains unknown. According to José Mattoso, Vatalandi is near Santarém. Perhaps in Valada, in the municipality of Cartaxo.

== Sources ==
- Alexandre Herculano (1901), Historia de Portugal, Vol I.
- Christóvam Ayres de Magalhães Sepúlveda (1902), História orgânica e política do exército portuguêz, Vol. III.
- Francisco de S. Luiz (1873), Obras completas do cardeal Saraiva, Vol II.
