= Buthaina bint al-Mu'tamid ibn Abbad =

11th-century poet of Al-Andalus

- بثينة بنت المعتمد بن عباد
- Born: 1070; Al-Andalus
- Died: Unknown
- Occupation: Poet
- Relatives: Al-Mu'tamid ibn Abbad (father), Al-Rumaikiyya (mother)
- Writing career
- Language: Arabic
- Period: 11th century
- Genre: Poetry
- Notable work: "Listen to my words"

Buthaina bint al-Mu'tamid ibn Abbad (Arabic: بثينة بنت المعتمد بن عباد, romanized: Buthayna bint al-Muʿtamid ibn ʿAbbād) was a poet of Al-Andalus.

She was born in 1070 and was the daughter of al-Mu'tamid ibn Abbad, ruler of the Taifa of Seville, and his consort Al-Rumaikiyya, an Andalusian poet. One of her poems, "Listen to my words", is about being sold into slavery after her father was overthrown.

After the initial fall of her father's rule, Buthaina had escaped, but was ambushed and enslaved. The man who bought her did not recognize her, and gave her to his son. Buthaina revealed who she was to the son (possibly because he wanted to have sex and she refused) and stated that they must marry. The son agreed, and sent a letter to Buthaina's father requesting permission to marry her. Buthaina wrote a poem which she sent to her father alongside the letter, explaining the situation - describing the son as kind and honourable - and asking for her father's blessing, which he gave.
