= Capture of Lisbon (1094) =

1094 battle

- Part of the Reconquista
Date	November 1094
Location	Lisbon 38°43′31″N 09°09′00″W
Result	Almoravid victory

Belligerents
Almoravid dynasty	Kingdom of Castile

Commanders and leaders
Syr ibn Abi Bakr	Raymond of Burgundy

Strength
Unknown	Unknown

Casualties and losses
Unknown	Heavy

The capture of Lisbon occurred in 1094 when the Almoravids, led by Syr ibn Abi Bakr, invaded and captured Lisbon from the Castilian governor, Count Raymond of Burgundy.

== History ==
During the winter of 1092-1093, the last ruler of Taifa of Badajoz, Al-Mutawwakil, made an alliance with Alfonso VI of León and Castile for help against the approaching Almoravids. Al-Mutawwakil gave the towns of Santarém, Lisbon, and Sintra to Alfonso VI.

King Alfonso VI took possession of the towns and handed them over to Raymond. However, the Christian control of these towns didn't last for long. In November 1094, the Almoravids general, Syr Ibn Abi Bakr, led a campaign to remove Al-Mutawwakil from power. Abi Bakr's forces captured Badajoz and executed Al-Mutawwakil and his sons.

After his victory, Abi Bakr marched to Lisbon. Raymond attempted to stop the advance, however, he was surprised and decisively defeated. Following that battle, the Almoravids attacked Lisbon, ultimately retaking this important stronghold into their possession.
