= Al-Mu'tamid ibn Abbad =

Last ruler of the taifa of Seville in Al-Andalus and poet (1040-1095) (r. c.1069-1091)

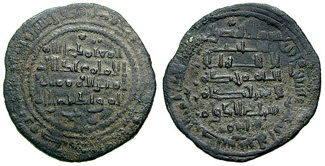
- Billon dirham coin of al-Mu'tamid ibn Abbad

Emir of the Seville Taifa
- Reign: 1069–1091
- Predecessor: Abbad II al-Mu'tadid
- Successor: Yusuf ibn Tashfin (as Almoravid ruler)
- Born: c. 1040; Beja, Al-Andalus
- Died: c. 1095; Aghmat, Almoravid Empire (now Morocco)
- Burial: Aghmat
- Spouse: Al-Rumaikiyya
- Children: Buthaina (daughter)
Names
- Al-Mu'tamid Muhammad ibn Abbad Ibn Ismail al-Lakhmi (Arabic: المعتمد محمد ابن عباد بن اسماعيل اللخمي)
- Dynasty: Abbadid
- Father: Abbad II al-Mu'tadid
- Religion: Sunni Islam

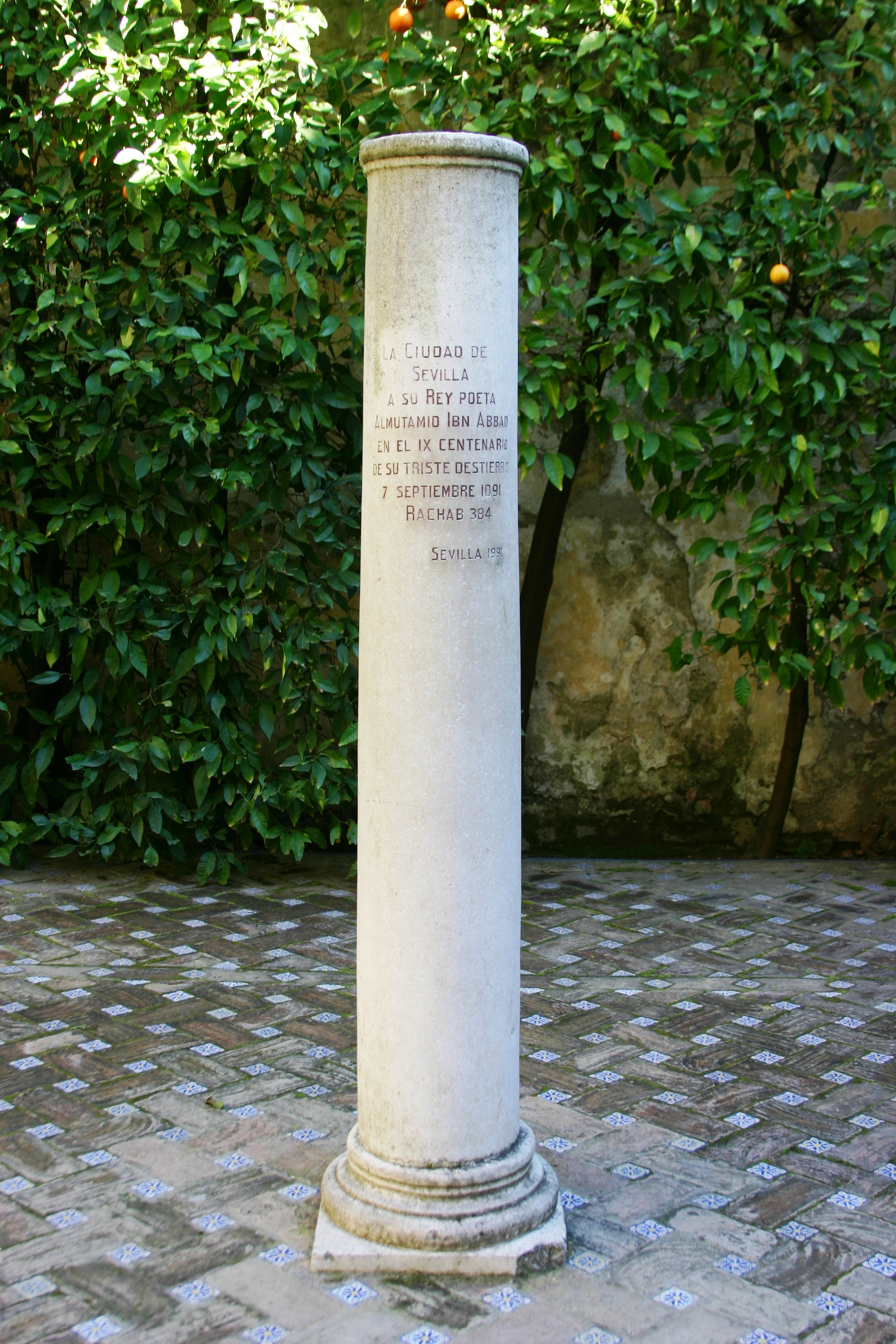
Column of Al-Mutamid, Jardines de los Reales Alcázares, Alcázar of Seville

al-Muʿtamid Muḥammad ibn ʿAbbād al-Lakhmī (Arabic: المعتمد محمد ابن عباد بن اسماعيل اللخمي; reigned c. 1069–1091, lived 1040–1095), also known as Abbad III, was the third and last ruler of the Taifa of Seville in Al-Andalus, as well as a renowned poet. He was the final ruler of the Arab Abbadid dynasty of Seville, before being deposed by the Almoravids in 1091.

== Early life ==
When he was 13 years old, Al-Mu'tamid's father bestowed on him the title of Emir and appointed the Andalusi Arabic poet Ibn Ammar as his vizier. However, Al-Mu'tamid fell strongly under the influence of Ibn Ammar. Al-Mu’tamid's father was wary of Ibn Ammar and the influence he had, ultimately sending him into exile.

== Reign ==
After the death of his father Abbad II al-Mu'tadid in 1069, Al-Mu'tamid inherited Seville as caliph. One of his first acts was to recall Ibn Ammar and to bestow military honours and high political offices on him, including as Governor of Silves and Prime Minister of the government in Seville. This reconciliation would later be rebuked for unknown reasons.

More likely the cause of resentment grew from the fact that the Prime Minister had let al-Mu'tamid's son, Prince al-Rasid, be captured and held hostage during a military campaign. He had also declared himself Emir of Murcia without properly acknowledging the rights of his own sovereign. The two men exchanged verses full of bitter criticisms and accusations. Murcia was subsequently lost and Ibn Ammar himself taken hostage. A final attempt to conspire with the young prince against his father proved too much for al-Mu'tamid, who "fell into a rage and hacked him to death with his own hands". After Ibn Ammar's death, the caliph was reported to have grieved bitterly and gave his former friend a sumptuous funeral.

Large parts of al-Andalus were under the dominion of al-Mu'tamid: to the west his territory encompassed the land between the lower Guadalquivir and Guadiana, plus the areas around Niebla, Huelva and Saltes. In the south it extended to Morón, Arcos, Ronda, and also Algeciras and Tarifa. The capital, Córdoba, was taken in 1070, lost in 1075, and regained in 1078.

Nevertheless, the family was still subject to taxation by the King of Castile, to whom they were vassals. The drain of these taxes effectively weakened the kingdom's power: al-Mu'tamid's decision to stop paying these taxes caused King Alfonso VI of Castile (who had already conquered Toledo in 1085) to besiege Seville. Al-Mu'tamid asked help from the Berber Almoravids of Morocco against the Castilian king. Al-Mu'tamid supported the Almoravid ruler Yusuf ibn Tashfin against Alfonso in the Battle of Sagrajas in 1086. The Almoravids established themselves at Algeciras and, after defeating the Christians, occupied all the Islamic taifas, including Seville itself in 1091. After they ravaged the city, al-Mu'tamid ordered his sons to surrender the royal fortress (the early Alcázar of Seville) in order to save their lives. When his son, Rashid, had advised him not to call on Yusuf ibn Tashfin, Al-Mu'tamid had rebuffed him:

I have no desire to be branded by my descendants as the man who delivered al-Andalus as prey to the infidels. I am loath to have my name cursed in every Muslim pulpit. And, for my part, I would rather be a camel-driver in Africa than a swineherd in Castile.

In 1091, Al-Mu'tamid was taken into captivity by the Almoravids and exiled to Aghmat, Morocco, where he died (or was perhaps assassinated) in 1095. His grave is located in the outskirts of Aghmat.

== Legacy ==
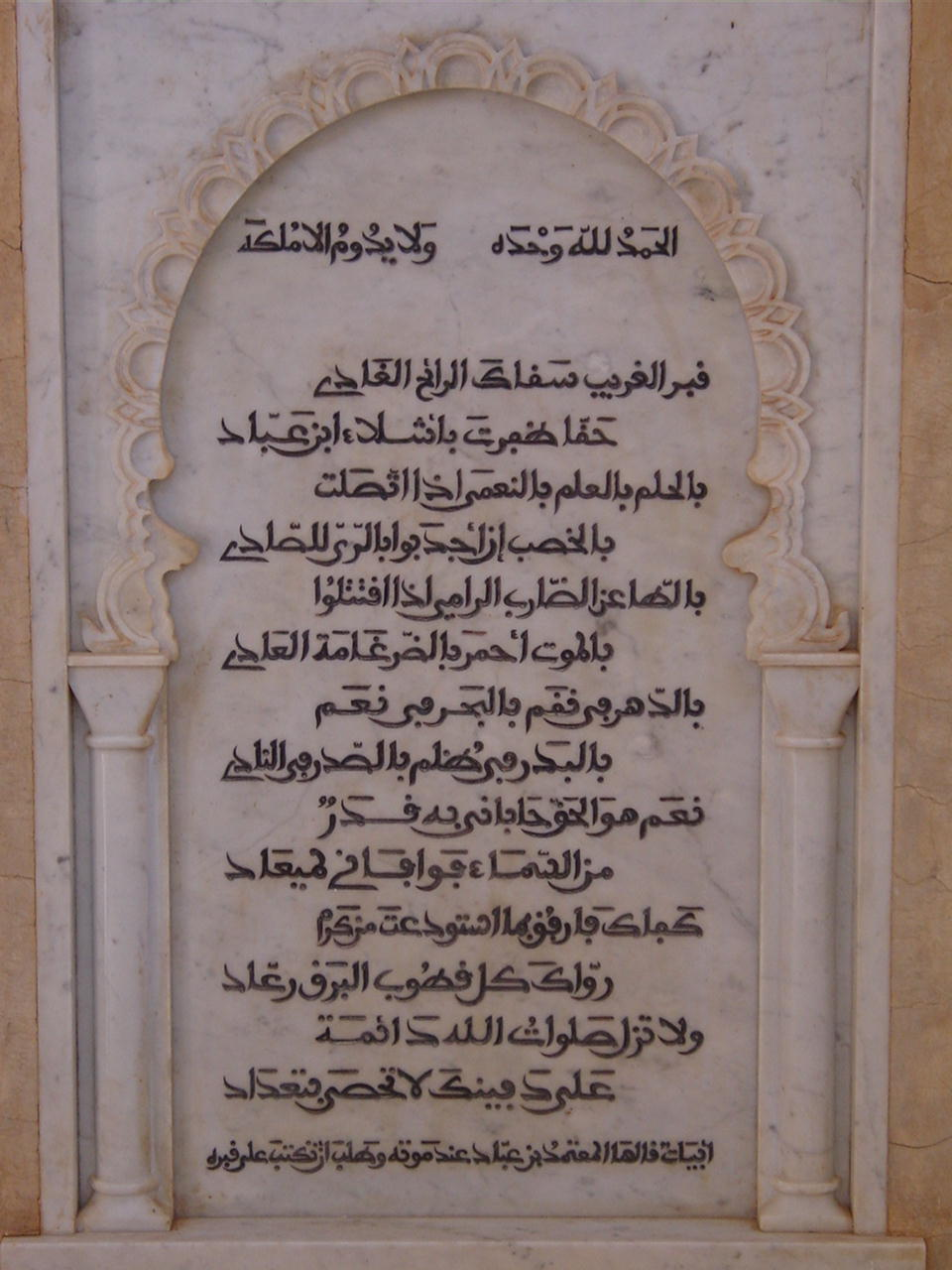
Al-Mu'tamid ibn Abbad's tomb in Aghmat, Morocco.

Al-Mu'tamid, one of the most eminent men of 11th-century al-Andalus, was highly regarded as a writer of poetry in Arabic. He was the father-in-law or father of Zaida of Seville, a concubine of Alfonso VI of Castile, possibly identical to his later wife, Queen Isabella. Iberian Muslim sources say that Zaida of Seville was the wife of Al-Mu'tamid's son Abu Nasr al-Fath al-Ma'mūn, Emir of the Taifa of Córdoba. Bishop Pelayo of Oviedo asserted that Zaida was the daughter of Abenath (Al-Mu'tamid ibn Abbad), a claim repeated by later Iberian Christian chroniclers that persisted in written histories for hundreds of years. However, the Islamic chroniclers are considered more reliable, and the general consensus among scholars now is that Zaida was Al-Mu'tamid's daughter-in-law.

== See also ==
- Abbadid dynasty
- Buthaina bint al-Mu'tamid ibn Abbad

== Sources ==
- Souissi, Ridha (1977). Al Mutamid Ibn Abbad et son oeuvre poétique : étude des thèmes. Université de Tunis.
- Scheindlin, Raymond P. (1974). Form and structure in the poetry of Al-Mutamid Ibn Abbad. Leiden: Brill.
- Hagerty, Miguel José (1979). Poesia / Al-Mutamid. Barcelona: Antoni Bosch.
- Rubiera Mata, María Jesús (1982). Poesías / Al Mutamid Ibn Abbad. Madrid: Universidad de Sevilla.
- de Oviedo, Pelayo. Chronicle of the Kings of Leon of Pelayo of Oviedo.
- Reilly, Bernard F. (1988). The Kingdom of Leon-Castilla under King Alfonso VI, 1065-1109. Publisher: Princeton University Press.

Preceded by Abbad II al-Mu'tadid	Abbadid emir of Seville; 1069–1091	Deposed by Yusuf ibn Tashfin (Almoravid dynasty)
