= Syr ibn Abi Bakr =

Governor of Meknes and the region of Maklata and Fazaz
- In office 1077–8 – ?
- Monarch: Yusuf ibn Tashfin

Governor of Seville
- In office 1091–1111
- Monarch: Yusuf ibn Tashfin
- Succeeded by: Yahya ibn Syr ibn Abi Bakr

Personal details
- Died: 1113 Seville
- Parent: Abu Bakr Tashfin (father)

Military service
- Allegiance: Almoravid empire
- Rank: governor of Meknes and the region of Maklata and Fazaz; Governor of al-Andalus; Governor of Seville; Governor of Badajoz
- Battles/wars: Battle of Sagrajas; Battle of Almodóvar del Río; Capture of Lisbon (1094); Battle of Vatalandi; Capture of Santarém (1111)

Syr ibn Abi Bakr ibn Tashfin (Arabic: سير بن أبي بكر) (d. 1113) was a Berber military commander for the Almoravid empire. He is considered one the greatest military tacticians that Ibn Tashfin had.

== Biography ==
Syr belonged to the Banu Turgut clan, of the Lamtuna, a Berber tribe belonging to the Sanhaja confederation. Syr ibn Abi Bakr was the son of Abu Bakr Tashfin. He was Yusuf ibn Tashfin’s nephew and he married Ibn tashfin's sister Hawwa and had a daughter and a son; Fatima and Yahya. He was one of the great generals of Yusuf ibn Tashfin and one of his principal collaborators. Appointed governor of Meknes and the region of Maklata and Fazaz, around 1077–8, he later attended the Battle of Sagrajas where he distinguished himself. When Yusuf decided to dethrone the kings of Taifas, he appointed Syr Governor of al-Andalus and charged him with all the affairs connected with it. He commanded an expedition that routed Alvar Fanez in Almodovar, who came to the aid of al-Mu'tamid. Seizing Seville in 1091, he was appointed governor of the city, a position he filled for twenty years. He will extend his governorship on Badajoz in 1094, seize Carmona, Niébla and attend the headquarters of Alédo. In 1104–1105, he routed in the region of Seville, a Castilian army and in May 1111, he seized Santarem. Three years later, going with his wife Hawwa and his daughter Fatima to Marrakech, to present her to 'Ali, he died suddenly around Seville in 1113, leaving the succession to his son Yahya. His daughter Fatima gave birth to the governor, Muhammad ibn Fatima.

== Sources ==
Lagardère, Vincent (1978). "Le gouvernorat des villes et la suprématie des Banu Turgut au Maroc et en Andalus de 477/1075 à 500/1106". Revue de l'Occident musulman et de la Méditerranée (in French). 25 (1): 49–65. doi:10.3406/remmm.1978.1803. ISSN 0035-1474.

Messier, Ronald A. (2010). The Almoravids and the Meanings of Jihad. ABC-CLIO. ISBN 9780313385896.
