= Liu Wansu =

Chinese physician of Jin dynasty

Liu Wansu (Chinese: 劉完素; pinyin: Líu Wánsù; 1110–1200), courtesy name Shouzhen (守真), was a Chinese physician of the Jin dynasty. He observed the high frequency of fever and inflammation in serious diseases and promoted the idea of using herbs of cooling nature to treat these conditions. This was a step in the opposite direction of many of his predecessors, who focused on using warming herbs. This work had much influence on the later concept of wen bing or epidemic febrile diseases, which corresponded to (and preceded) the Western concept of contagious disease. He also undertook a detailed study of the Su wen, describing the etiology of disease in relation to the teachings of that famous text.

Liu is credited with founding the "Cold and Cooling School" and developed the theory of "similar transformation". The body's host qi is yang, therefore warm. Hence any evil guest qi, either externally invading or internally engendered, will tend to transform into a warm or hot evil similar to the body's host or ruling qi. In recognition of his significant contributions to medical theory in China, Liu is considered one of the "four great masters" of the Jin and Yuan dynasties, alongside Zhang Congzheng, Li Dongyuan, and Zhu Zhenheng.
