= Aghmat =

Aghmat أغمات ⴰⵖⵎⴰⵜ
- Town
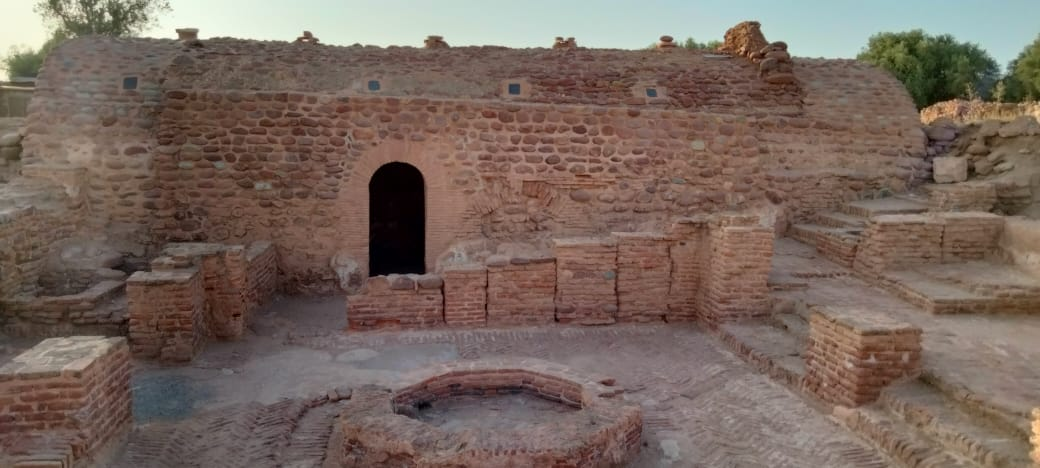
- Interactive map of Aghmat
- Coordinates: 31°25′21″N 7°48′4″W
- Country: Morocco
- Region: Marrakesh-Safi
- Province: Al Haouz
- Commune: Ghmate
- Time zone: UTC+0 (GMT)

Aghmat (Tashelhit: ⴰⵖⵎⴰⵜ, Arabic: أغمات Āghmāt; pronounced locally Ughmat, Uɣmat) was an important commercial medieval Berber town in Morocco. It is today an archaeological site known as "Joumâa Aghmat".

The city is located approximately 30 km south-east of Marrakesh on the Ourika road. The initial "a" of the name may be unvocalized, and the name may sometimes be spelled "Ghmat", "Ghmate" or even the French-style "Rhmate" (as it appears in the Michelin Guide).

According to a Berber legend, Aghmat was populated by Christian Berbers when it was conquered in 683 by the Muslim forces of Uqba ibn Nafi, a general of the Umayyad Caliphate in Syria. However, this story first surfaces almost 700 years after that date, and many historians give it no credibility. It is directly contradicted by one of the earliest Persian historians, al-Baladhuri. who states that Musa bin Nusair conquered the Sous and erected the mosque at Aghmāt.

== Early history ==
After the death of Idris II in 828, Morocco was divided among his sons. Aghmat became capital of the Souss region, according to Ibn Abi Zar under the Idrisid prince Abd Allah. According to Sara Toth Stub, Aghmat was ruled by Zenata Berbers.

When the Almoravids invaded from the Sahara Desert under Abd Allah ibn Yasin, Aghmāt was defended by Laqūt, leader of the Maghrawa tribe. Laqūt was defeated and the Almoravid army entered the city on 23 Rabi II 450 (27 June 1058). One of the wealthiest of Aghmāt's citizens was Laqūt's widow, Zaynab an-Nafzawiyyat, who married the Almoravid leader Abu-Bakr Ibn-Umar and placed her considerable wealth at his disposal. After Abu-Bakr returned to the Sahara Desert in 1071, Zaynab married his successor Yusuf ibn Tashfin.

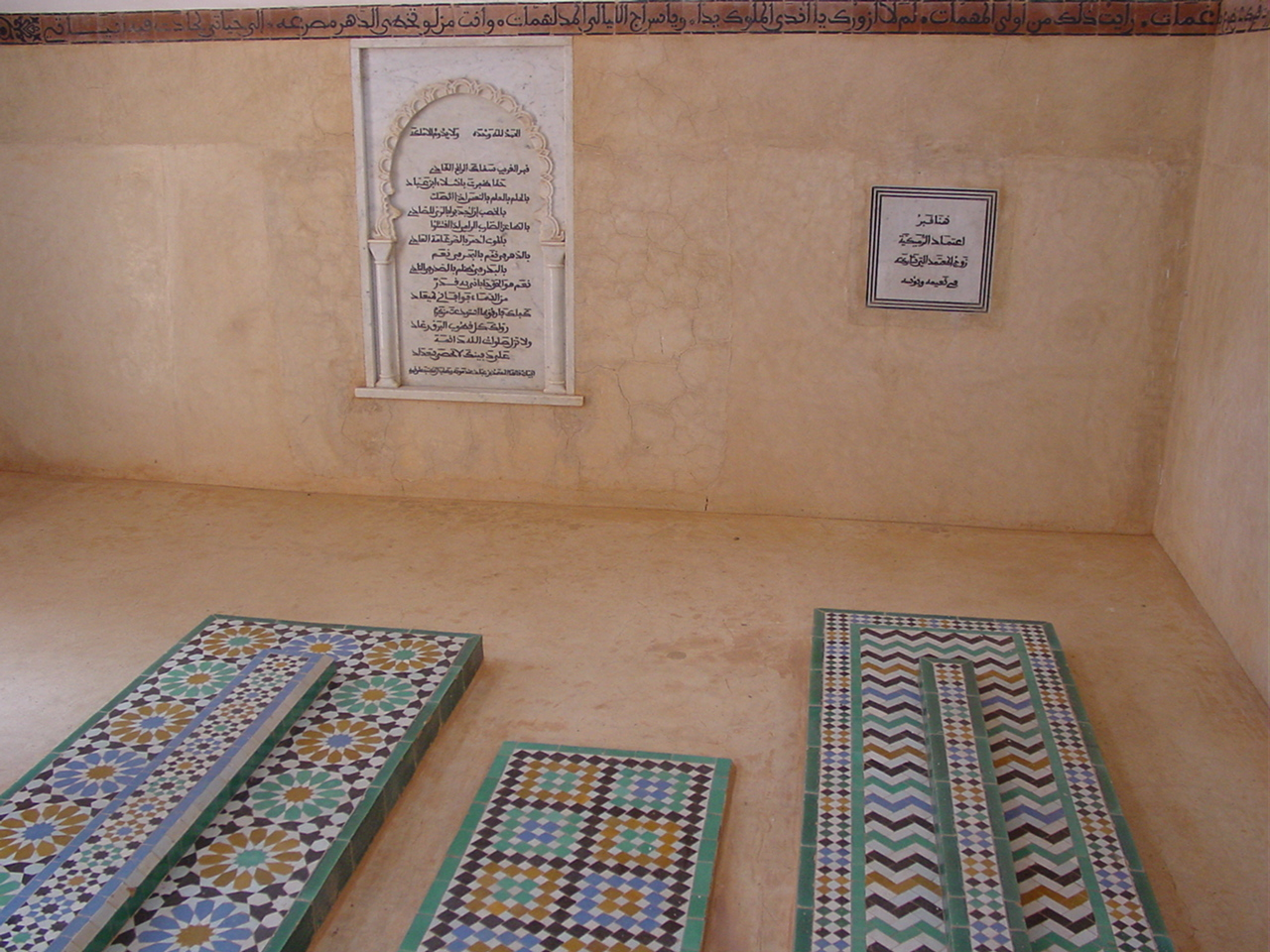
Tomb of the poet prince Al-Mu'tamid ibn Abbad, Aghmat was used as a place of exile after the capital was moved to Marrakesh

By 1068/1069, the population of the city had grown considerably, and Abu-Bakr decided to construct a new capital. He founded Marrakesh in 1070, after which Aghmāt declined. The Almoravids continued to use it as a convenient backwater in which to exile people. These included Al Mutamid, former king of Seville and Córdoba and noted poet. His tomb remains a place of pilgrimage to this day. Aghmat was also the place of exile where Abdallah ibn Buluggin, the former king of Granada, wrote his memoirs.

In the years 1126, 1127 and again in 1130, the city saw a number of battles between the Almoravid sultan Ali ibn Yusuf and the Almohad army led by Ibn Tumart and Abd al-Mu'min. Following a general rout of Almoravid forces throughout Morocco and Algeria, Abd al-Mu'min entered Aghmāt without a fight on the middle day of Muharram 541 (27 June 1146).

Beaumier, writing in 1860, stated the town still had a population of 5500, of whom 1000 were Jews.

=== Earlier economy ===
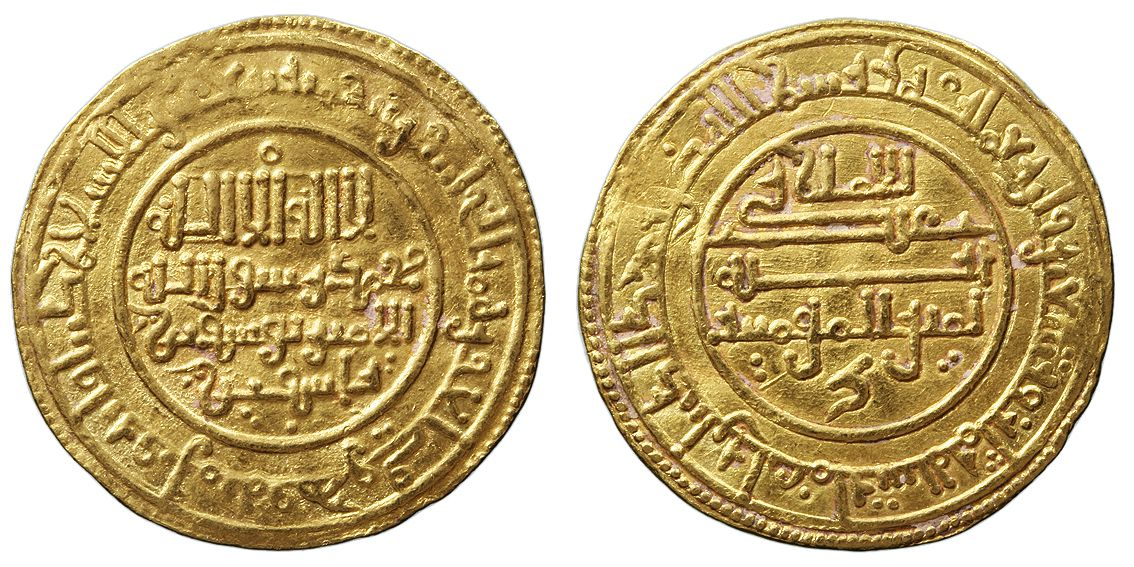
Dinar minted in Aghmat by Almoravid king Yusuf ibn Tashfin.

Al Bakri, writing in the 11th century on the eve of the Almoravid rise to power, described Aghmāt as a flourishing city where 100 cattle and 1000 sheep were slaughtered for sale in the Sunday souk (market). The inhabitants elected their own leader. Strictly speaking there were two Aghmāts: the commercial and political center was known as "Aghmāt Wurīka", and 8 miles distant from that was "Aghmāt Aylan" which was closed to outsiders. The town was served by the seaport of Qūz on the Atlantic coast three days journey west.

== Modern history ==
On 18 November 1950, during the French occupation of Morocco, a group of Moroccan nationalists associated with the Istiqlal party held a demonstration at the tomb of Al-Mutamid. This was brutally suppressed by police acting under orders from Boujane, the caïd of the local Mesfioua tribe. Subsequent actions became one of the major irritants between Boujane's superior, the powerful Pasha of Marrakesh T'hami El Glaoui, and the King of Morocco Mohammed V, which eventually led to the king's brief overthrow.

The archaeological ruins visible today consist of part of the city walls, hammam, parts of some houses and qanats (irrigation canals), and some hundred metres or so of the city ramparts.

The tomb of Al-Mutamid is marked by a contemporary mausoleum. It was erected in 1970 and has a cupola in the Almoravid style.
