= Adalbert of Mainz =

Adalbert of Mainz may refer to:

- Adalbert I of Mainz, archbishop (1111–1137)
- Adalbert II of Mainz, archbishop (1138–1141)
- Adalbert III of Mainz, administrator of the archdiocese (1482–1484)
