= Abu Nasr Farsi =

Abu Nasr Farsi (Persian: ابو نصر فارسی), also known as Abu Nasr-i Parsi (ابو نصر من پارسی), was a Persian statesman, warrior and poet, who served the Ghaznavid sultan Ibrahim (r. 1059–1099) and the latter's son Mas'ud III (r. 1099–1115). There is lack of information about his early life, however, it is known that his family had moved to Lahore and had a long history of service to the Ghaznavids. Abu Nasr spent most of his time in Punjab during the reign of Ibrahim. During the reign of Mas'ud III, he fell out of favor and was deprived of his posts. He died in 1116/1117 during the reign of Arslan-Shah of Ghazna. Abu Nasr was not only a prominent statesman and warrior, but also a great poet. His verses are highly admired by Aufi and Nizami Aruzi.

== Sources ==
- C. E. Bosworth "Abu Nasr Farsi." Encyclopedia Iranica. 24 January 2014. <http://www.iranicaonline.org/articles/abu-nasr-hebatallah-farsi>
- C. Edmund, Bosworth (1995). The Later Ghaznavids: Splendour and Decay: The Dynasty in Afghanistan and Northern India 1040-1186. Munshiram Manoharlal Publishers Private, Limited. ISBN 9788121505772.
- Sharma, Sunil (2000). Persian Poetry at the Indian Frontier: Masʻŝud Saʻd Salmân of Lahore. Orient Blackswan. ISBN 9788178240091.
