= Battle of Philomelion =

Battle of Philomelion may refer to:

== In Asia Minor ==
- Battle of Philomelion (1116), a battle between the Byzantine Empire forces against forces of the Sultanate of Rûm.
- Battle of Philomelion (1190), a battle between the Holy Roman Empire forces against forces of the Sultanate of Rûm.
