= Siege of Nicaea (1113) =

Coordinates: 40.5833°N 30.1333°E

- Part of the Byzantine–Seljuk wars
Date	1113
Location	Nicaea, Asia Minor (modern-day İznik, Bursa, Turkey)
Result	Byzantine victory

Belligerents
Byzantine Empire	Sultanate of Rum

Strength
Unknown	Unknown

The siege of Nicaea of 1113 occurred in the course of the Byzantine-Seljuk wars.

After suffering defeat at the hands of the First Crusade, the Seljuk Sultanate of Rum beat back the Crusade of 1101 and resumed its offensive operations against the East Roman (Byzantine) Empire. Emperor Alexios I Komnenos, suffering from old age, was unable to deal with the swift Turkish raids into what was left of Byzantine Anatolia. However, the Seljuk Turks were unsuccessful in their siege of Nicaea, which they had lost in the First Crusade.
