= Ali ibn Yusuf =

5th Almoravid king (r. 1106–1143)

- Amir al-Muslimin
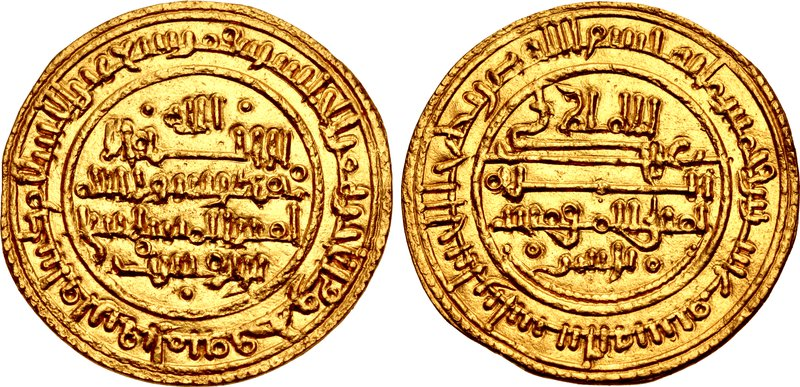
- Gold dinar minted during the reign of Ali ibn Yusuf

Amir of the Almoravids
- Reign: 1106–1143
- Predecessor: Yusuf ibn Tashfin
- Successor: Tashfin ibn Ali
- Born: c. 1084; Ceuta
- Died: 28 January 1143
- Dynasty: Almoravid
- Father: Yusuf ibn Tashfin
- Mother: Zaynab an-Nafzawiyyah
- Religion: Islam

Ali ibn Yusuf (also known as Ali Ben Youssef; Arabic: علي بن يوسف; c. 1084 – 28 January 1143) was an Almoravid emir who ruled the Almoravid dynasty from 1106 until his death in 1143. He succeeded his father, Yusuf ibn Tashfin, and was succeeded by his son, Tashfin ibn Ali.

During Ali ibn Yusuf's reign, the Almoravid dynasty faced increasing pressure from Christian kingdoms in the Iberian Peninsula, as well as opposition from emerging Muslim movements. He continued his predecessor's policies in Iberia and North Africa, leading military campaigns against Christian territories while maintaining Almoravid authority over its domains.

== Early life ==
Ali ibn Yusuf was born in 1084–1085 (477 AH) in Ceuta. He was the son of Yusuf ibn Tashfin, the fourth Almoravid ruler. According to some sources, his mother was Zaynab an-Nafzawiyyah. According to some others, his mother was Qamar or Qamra, surnamed Fadl al-Hasan, a Christian captive from al-Andalus who became Yusuf's concubine. A woman Qamar is also cited by some sources as Ali Ibn Yusuf's own concubine and the mother of his son Syr.

== Reign ==
At the time of his father's death, in September 1106, he was 23 years old. He succeeded his father on 2 September 1106. Ali ruled from Morocco and appointed his brother Tamim ibn Yusuf as governor of Al-Andalus. Ali expanded his territories in the Iberian Peninsula by capturing the Taifa of Zaragoza in 1110.

The early part of his reign is notable for the Almoravids reaching the apogee of their dominance in Andalus. The Almoravid armies laid siege to the capitals of three Christian kingdoms in quick succession - Toledo (Kingdom of Castile) in 1114, Barcelona (County of Barcelona) in 1115 and Coimbra (County of Portugal) in 1117 but having failed in these sieges, their fortunes quickly reversed. Zaragoza, a major city and its surroundings was lost it to Alfonso I, King of Aragon from 1118 - 1120. Córdoba briefly rebelled against the Almoravids in 1121.

The decade from 1120-1130 involved the bitter struggle with Alfonso I of Aragon known as the Battler, the border with Castile and Portugal remained stable however therein except with the loss of some notable forts near Toledo captured in the 1109 campaign like Zorita and Siguenza. During this period, many Almoravid troops would be recalled across the straits to defend against the newly-founded movement of Ibn Tumart, the Almohads.

Tashfin bin Ali, his son and former governor of Granada, took the role of the governor of Al Andalus in 1126 and would in the following years until 1137 (the year of his departure to Morocco) lead the Almoravids to some notable victories (Aceca in 1130, Fraga in 1134, Badajoz in 1134, Escalona 1137) but he also suffered some losses therein. From 1138 onwards definitively the impetus was on the side of the Christians and the Muslims suffered major losses in raids and the capture of important fortresses (Oreja in 1139, Coria in 1142). This was in part due to the renewed offensive of the Almohads in Morocco.

In 1139, he lost the Battle of Ourique against the Portuguese forces led by count Afonso Henriques, which allowed Afonso to proclaim himself an independent King.

Ali died on 28 January 1143 and was succeeded by his son Tashfin ibn Ali.

== Patronage ==
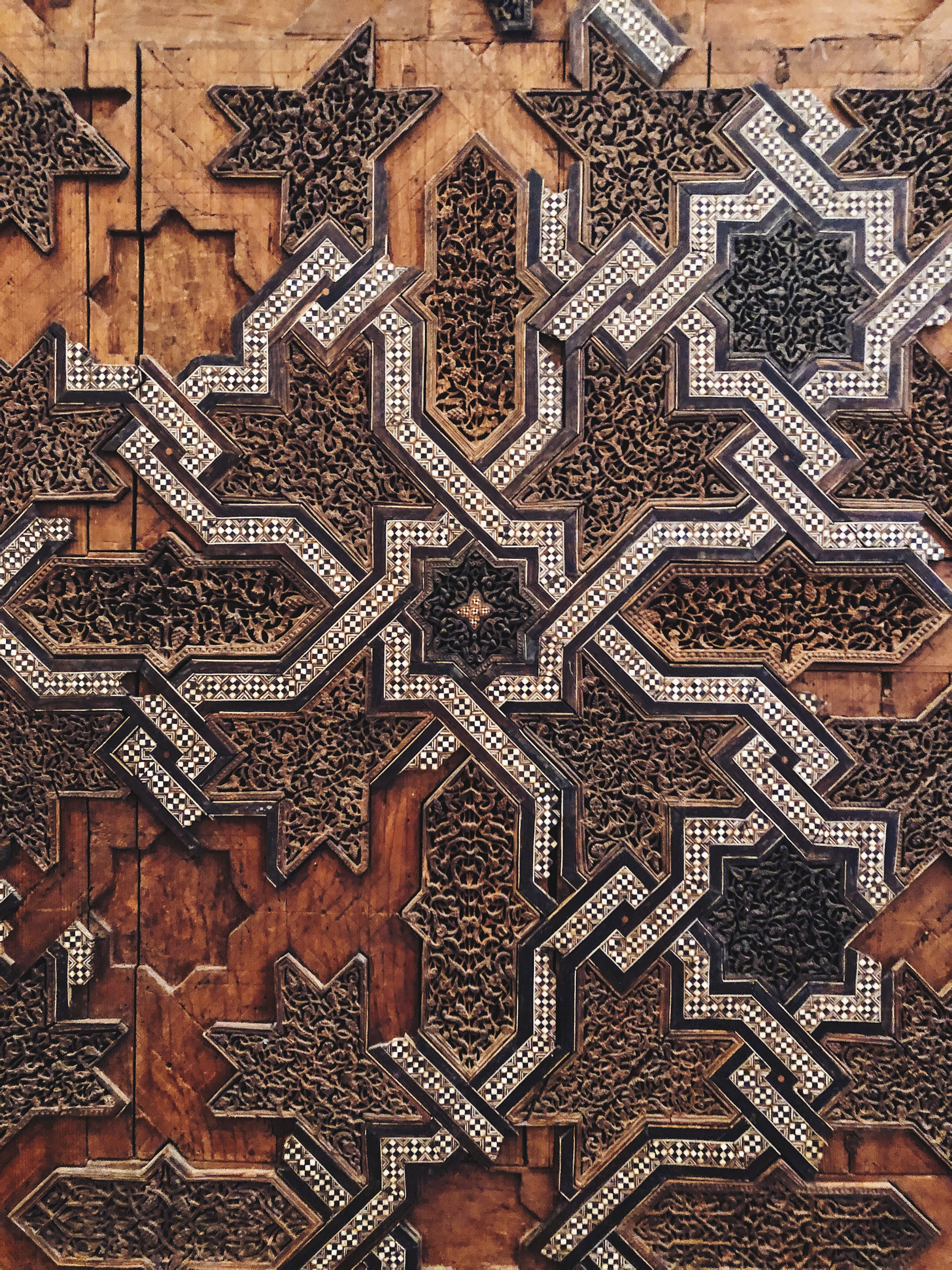
The Almoravid minbar, commissioned by Ali ibn Yusuf in 1137 and built in Cordoba.

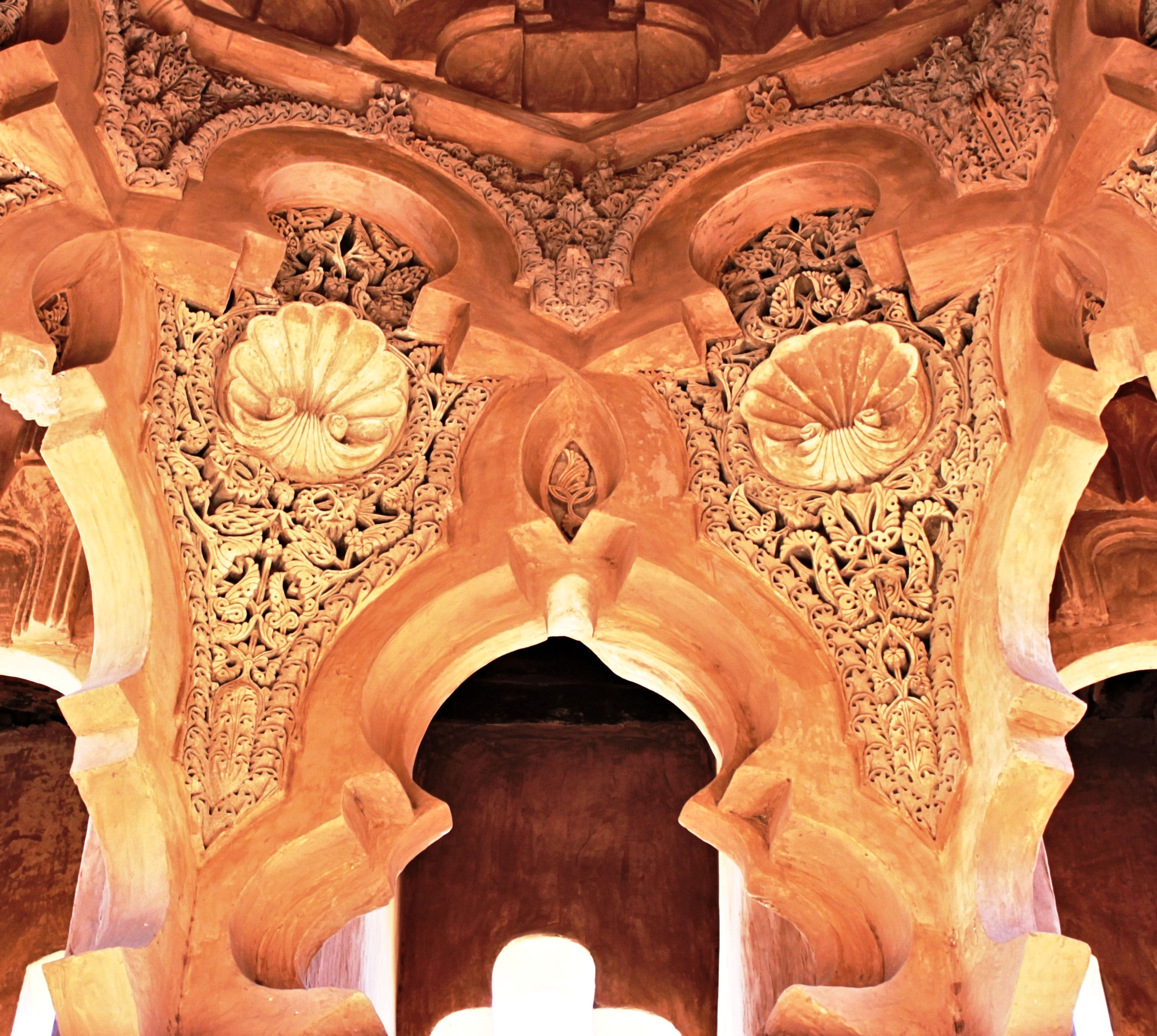
Internal view of the Almoravid Qubba, inscribed with Ali's name.

He commissioned a minbar now known as the Minbar of the Kutubiyya Mosque from a workshop in Córdoba to furnish his grand mosque, the original Ben Youssef Mosque (destroyed under the Almohads), in the imperial capital, Marrakesh. The Almoravid Qubba also bears Ali's name.

At the advice of Abu Walid Ibn Rushd (grandfather of Averroes), Ali built walls around Marrakesh as Ibn Tumart became more influential. There had been walls around the mosque and the palace, but Ali ibn Yūsuf spent 70,000 gold dinars on the city's fortifications, doubling the city's size, and told the amirs of Al-Andalus to fortify their walls as well.

He also established an irrigation system in Marrakesh, a project managed by Obeyd Allah ibn Younous al-Muhandes. This irrigation system made use of qanawat (قناة, p. قنوات). Ali also had the first bridge over the Tensift River built.

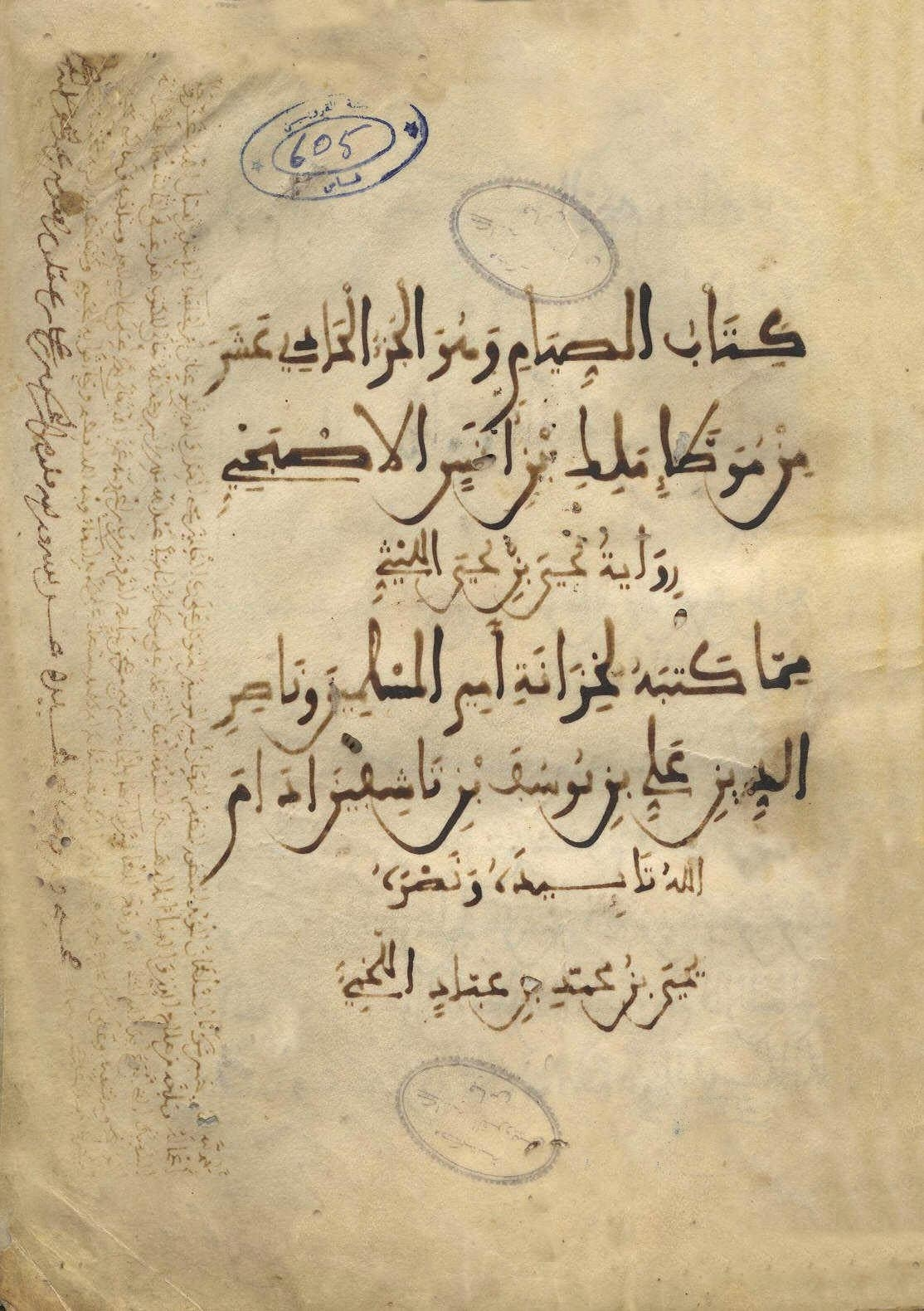
A manuscript of Kitāb as-Siām from Muwatta al-Imam Malik as read by Yahya ibn Yahya al-Laythi, written for Ali ibn Yūsuf.

== Sargasso Sea ==
According to the Muslim cartographer Muhammad al-Idrisi, the Mugharrarin (also translated as "the adventurers") sent by Ali ibn Yusuf, led by his admiral Ahmad ibn Umar, better known under the name of Raqsh al-Auzz reached a part of the ocean covered by seaweed, identified by some as the Sargasso Sea, which stretches into the Atlantic from Bermuda.

== Family ==
Ali was the son of Yusuf ibn Tashfin. He had at least two sons:

- Tashfin ibn Ali, governor of Granada and Almeria in 1129 and Cordoba in 1131. Succeeded his father in 1143.
- Ishaq ibn Ali. Died in 1147.

| Preceded by Yusuf ibn Tashfin | Almoravids; 1106–1143 | Succeeded by Tashfin ibn Ali |
