= Battle of al-Funt (1038) =

1038 battle in Spain

- The Taifa kingdoms in 1037, one year before the battle of al-Funt (1038)
Date	4 August 1038
Location	al-Funt
Result	Zirid victory

Belligerents
Zirid Taifa of Granada	Amirid Taifa of Almería

Commanders and leaders
Badis ibn Habus; Buluggin ibn Habus; Samuel ibn Naghrela	Zuhayr al-Siqlabi †

Strength
Unknown	Unknown

Casualties and losses
Unknown	Unknown

The Battle of al-Funt (Friday 4 August 1038) was a battle that took place near modern-day Deifontes between the forces of the Taifa of Granada ruled by Badis ibn Habus against the forces of the Taifa of Almería led by Zuhayr al-Siqlabi, it ended with a Granadan Zirid victory and the death of Zuhayr, marking an end to the hegemony of the Amirids in Eastern Andalucia.

== Background ==
In 1038, the Zirid king of Granada Habbus al-Muzaffar died and his son Badis ibn Habus succeeded him as the new king of the Taifa, hearing the death of Habbus, Zuhayr cast covetous eyes on Granada, he dissolved his alliance with the Zirids and decided to attack the Taifa of Granada territory after accepting his Vizier Abbas advice.

== Battle ==
Zuhayr troops pitched camp near al-Funt (Deifontes) near Granada, Badis ibn Habus appointed his brother Bullugin in charge of the Zirid army, Samuel ibn Naghrillah participated in the campaign too, they meet the Amirids in al-Funt, where the later got defeated in one hour, Zuhayr was killed and some notable men like Ibn Hazm were captured in 4 August 1038.

== Aftermath ==
The Battle marked an end to the Amirids hegemony in Eastern Andalucia, Badis ibn Habus conquered Zuhayr's territory and secured the district adjacent Almería, he succeeded in taking his enemy Zuhayr secretary and ordered his death for being responsible of the conflict.

Almería was captured by Abd al-Aziz al-Mansur and given to ibn Sumadih, the later declared independence with Badis ibn Habus consent, eventually making Almería under the Granadan influence.
