= Battle of Arjona (1041) =

1041 battle in Spain

- The Taifa kingdoms in 1037
Date	1041
Location	Arjona
Result	Taifa of Granada victory

Belligerents
Zirid Taifa of Granada	Zirid Rebels

Commanders and leaders
Badis ibn Habus; Samuel ibn Naghrela	Yaddyr; Wasil †; Muwaffaq †

Strength
Unknown	Unknown

Casualties and losses
Unknown	Unknown

The Battle of Arjona (1041) was a battle that took place near the city of Arjona in Al-Andalus between the Taifa of Granada forces ruled by Badis ibn Habus under command of Vizier Samuel ibn Naghrillah against the two well-known Andalusian Commanders Wasil and Muwaffaq supporting a Zirid rebel "Yaddyr" nephew of Habbus al-Muzaffar. The battle resulted in a victory for the Taifa of Granada forces and later capture of Yaddyr marking an end to his threat to Badis ibn Habus's throne.

== Background ==
Habbus al-Muzaffar king of the Taifa of Granada favored his nephew Yaddyr over his first born son Badis ibn Habus to succeed him as the future king of the Taifa, but Samuel ibn Naghrillah managed to help Badis to succeed his father.

Upon the death of Habbus al-Muzaffar, his son Badis ibn Habus succeeded him, but the new king faced serious struggles during his first period of rule, Yaddyr was his rival to the throne, Abu'l Futuh al-Jurjani a prominent astrologer and men of letters supported Yaddyr in a plot against Badis's life, the rival Taifa of Seville supported him too, however, after its defeat at the Battle of Écija (1039) and the discovery of the plot of Yaddyr, Abu'l Futuh gave himself to Badis ibn Habus who shortly after managed to execute him, Yaddyr was still in exile and then joined forces with Wasil and Muwaffaq two well-known commanders in Al-Andalus.

== Battle ==
Wasil and Muwaffaq joined forces with Yaddyr in Arjona , they invaded the city and killed its commander, then they reached a place called Samantin, and overcame most of the castles there.

Samuel ibn Naghrillah vizier of Badis ibn Habus likely confronted them at Arjona where he was victorious and Wasil and Muwaffaq were killed, Samuel wrote poems describing his victory at the battlefield.

== Aftermath ==
Yaddyr fled and was trapped near Córdoba , where he was taken and imprisoned in the castle of Munekar, and Badis ibn Habus managed to get rid of his threat.
