= Siege of Toledo (1090) =

Attempt to capture Toledo in 1090

- Part of the Reconquista
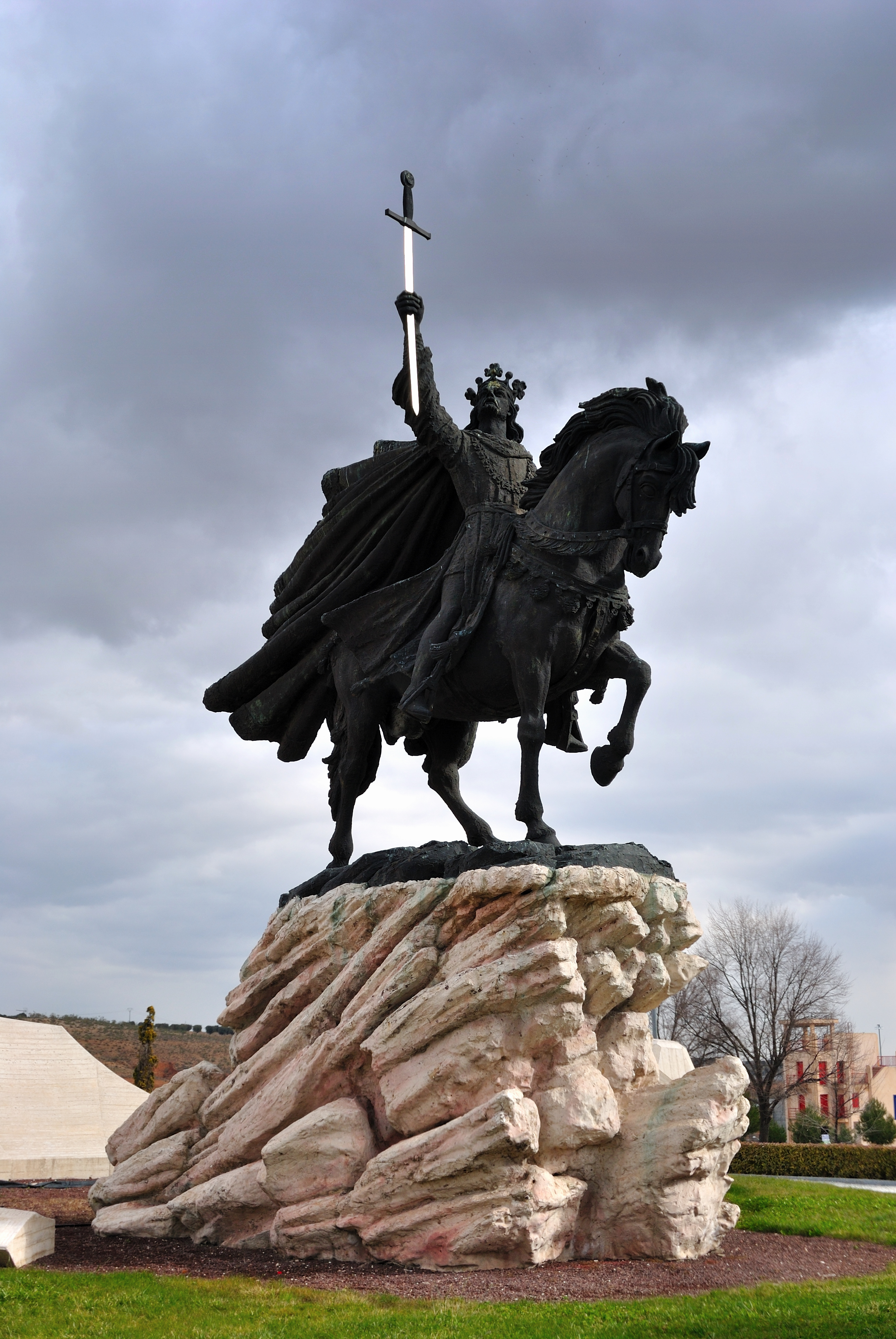
- Statue of Alfonso VI of León and Castile in Toledo
Date	10 July – August 1090
Location	Toledo, Kingdom of Castile 39°51′24″N 4°1′28″W
Result	Castilian victory

Belligerents
Kingdom of Castile	Almoravid dynasty

Commanders and leaders
Unknown	Yusuf ibn Tashfin

Strength
Unknown	Unknown

Casualties and losses
Unknown	Unknown

The Siege of Toledo in 1090 was an unsuccessful attempt by the Almoravid Amir Yusuf ibn Tashfin to conquer the city of Toledo which had been captured by Alfonso VI of León and Castile in 1085.

== Background ==
In 1086, the ruler of the Taifa of Seville, Al-Mu'tamid ibn Abbad, who had launched a series of aggressive attacks on neighboring kingdoms arising from the disintegration of the Caliphate of Córdoba, saw his domains threatened by Alfonso VI, who had conquered Toledo in 1085 and saw the introduction of parias, which strengthened the economy of the Christian kingdom. To blunt the incursions of Alfonso VI, Al-Mu'tamid asked for help from the Almoravids, who accommodated his request and landed forces commanded by Yusuf at Algeciras. Yusuf went on to defeat the Christians at the Battle of Sagrajas and then returned to North Africa.

A second call for help and a second campaign to Al-Andalus in 1088 enabled Yusuf to participate in the siege of Aledo and perceive the weakness of the Taifas, who were undecided between an alliance with the Almoravids or the Christians. Ultimately, Yusul's position of strength will enable him to settle in al-Andalus after a third military of his own volition.

== Siege ==
Yusuf disembarked on 10 June 1090 and went directly to Toledo, as the first movement for the conquest of all Muslim territories. The Taifas, aware of the intentions of the Almoravids, did not support him in this campaign and negotiations had already begun with Alfonso VI.

The defenses of the city were prepared to withstand a long siege; the garrison was well prepared; and nearby were the Castles of Oreja and Maqueda. In the middle of July, Yusuf learned that a Castilian and Navarrese contingent led by Alfonso VI and Sancho I of Aragon were coming to the city, so he lifted the siege in August.

== Consequences ==
After verifying the lack of support he received from the Taifas, Yusuf attacked them, gaining control of the various Muslim kingdoms. Thus, he deposes the ruler of Granada and places his cousin in his place as governor of the conquered Andalusian territories, with the mission of attacking and annexing new Taifas. In 1090, the Almoravids took Malaga and Granada; in 1091, Almeria, Córdoba and Seville, Badajoz in 1094 and Valencia in 1102.

== Bibliography ==
- Mínguez Fernández, José María (2000). Alfonso VI: poder, expansíon y reorganización interior (in Spanish). Editorial NEREA. ISBN 978-84-89569-47-8.
- Álvarez Palenzuela, Vicente A. (2005). Edad Media: historia de España (in Spanish). Editorial Ariel. ISBN 978-84-344-6793-4.
- Busic, Jason (2018). A Companion to Medieval Toledo. BRILL. ISBN 978-90-04-38051-6.
- Reilly, Bernard F. (1993). The Medieval Spains. Cambridge University Press. ISBN 978-0-521-39741-4.
- Díez, Gonzalo Martínez (2003). Alfonso VI: señor del Cid, conquistador de Toledo (in Spanish). Temas de Hoy. ISBN 978-84-8460-251-4.
- Exposición triángulo de al-Andalus (in Spanish). El Legado Andalusí. 2003. ISBN 978-84-932923-3-1.
- Syed, Muzaffar Husain (2011). Concise History of Islam. Vij Books India Pvt. ISBN 978-93-82573-47-0.
- Media, Everest (2022). Summary of Raymond Ibrahim's Defenders of the West. Everest Media LLC. ISBN 979-8-3500-1615-4.
- Bennison, Amira K. (2016). Almoravid and Almohad Empires. ISBN 978-0-7486-4682-1.
