= Siege of Aledo =

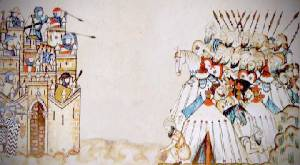
- A painting of the battle
| Date | 1090 |
| Location | Aledo, Spain 37°47′44.99″N 1°34′23.99″W |
| Result | Castilian-Leonese victory |

Belligerents
| Almoravid Empire; Taifa of Sevilla; Minor Taifas: Taifa of Granada; Taifa of Murcia; Taifa of Almeria; Taifa of Malaga | Kingdom of Castile; Kingdom of Leon |

Strength
| Unknown | Unknown |

Casualties and losses
| Unknown | Unknown |

The Siege of Aledo was the unsuccessful attempt of the Almoravid Empire and Muslim Taifa Kingdoms in al-Andalus to retake the castle of Aledo from King Alfonso VI of Leon and Castile. It was one of many battles in the conflict between the Almoravids and the Taifa kingdoms on one side, and the Kingdom of Castile on the other.

== Background ==
In the second half of the 11th century, the taifa king al-Mu'tamid of Seville, who had pursued an aggressive policy of expansion against neighboring states arising from the decomposition of the Caliphate of Cordoba, found his own domains threatened when King Alfonso VI of Leon and Castile conquered Toledo in 1085. Just a year later, his troops captured the castle of Aledo led by the knight García Jiménez. The control over Toledo and the occupation of Aledo were part of the Castilian-Leonese strategy to weaken the fragmented Muslim power. The definitive fall of Toledo served as a significant blow, giving Christians renewed momentum in subduing southern territories.

While some taifas agreed to pay tributes, strengthening the economy of Christian kingdoms, others sought assistance from the Almoravids. The Almoravids landed in al-Yazira al-Jadra in 1086, defeating the Christians at the Battle of Sagrajas. Despite this, the expedition led by Emir Yusuf ibn Tashufin chose to return to the Maghreb upon hearing of his son's death. Aledo gained importance as an isolated Christian outpost in Islamic territory, challenging the surrounding taifas. Castilian-Leonese forces instilled fear in the Murcian taifa population with daring raids on the orchards of Murcia and Orihuela, seizing control of the Guadalentín Valley and key Levantine communication routes. The Andalusian principalities, concerned, once again sought the aid of the Almoravids.

== Battle ==
Yusuf returned to al-Andalus in 1090, using Gibraltar as a landing point. At Algeciras, his troops were joined by those of Sevillian al-Mu'tamid, and together they advanced to Málaga, where the taifa Tamim ibn Buluggin joined them with his hosts. The aim of al-Mu'tamid, despite his protests as a defender of Islam against the Christian raids from Aledo, was to take the castle and the dominion of Murcia for his son, which his own vizier had taken from him.

On the way to Aledo, Abdallah ibn Buluggin from Granada and al-Mu‘tásim bi-l-Lah from Almería joined the already numerous force. while Ibn Rashiq of Murcia collaborated by sending men and money.

The Muslim army set up camp at the foot of the castle of Aledo, and began to harass the Christian position by means of mangonels and ballistas shots, built expressly by expert craftsmen brought from Murcia.

The assaults occurred day and night, with one of the emirs' army attacking in rotation each day. but time passed without achieving the surrender of the Leonese garrison. The morale of the besiegers began to suffer and tensions arose between them, to the point that Ibn Rashiq, fearing that al-Mu'tamid intended to annex Murcia to his taifa of Seville, supplied the besieged. Finally dismissed by Yusuf due to a fatwa, the Murcians abandoned the siege, refused to submit to the Sevillians and asked for help from the Christian king Alfonso VI.

El Cid intended to relieve the city, but it would be Alfonso himself who would march at the head of his troops to liberate Aledo, causing the Almoravids to retreat after a four-month siege. At the end of the summer and after insistent requests from the garrison and the Murcians who were hostile to Yusuf, Alfonso set out to relieve the city.

After the failure to capture Aledo, Yusuf decided it would be more to his advantage to begin to take control of al-Andalus from the Taifa kingdoms. As a result, Yusuf ordered his general, Syr ibn Abi Bakr, to invade the Taifa of Seville and other Muslim held territories. Yusuf returned to North Africa while his forces over the next nine month captured numerous cities including Tarifa, Cordoba, Carmona, and finally Seville.
