= Siege of Málaga (1065-1066) =

1065-1066 siege of Málaga in Spain

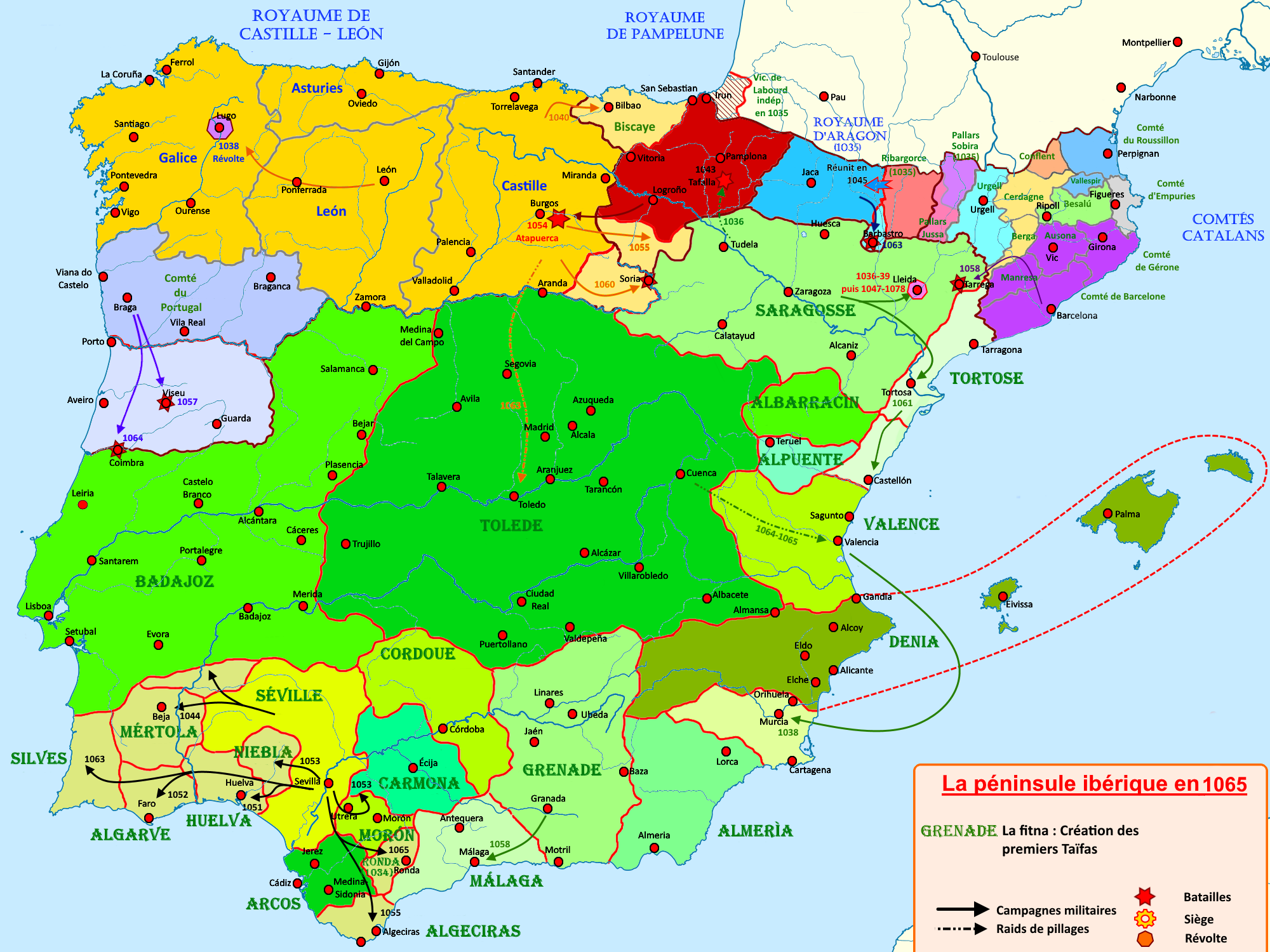
- The Taifa kingdoms in 1065
Date	1065-1066
Location	Málaga
Result	Zirid victory

Belligerents
Zirid Taifa of Granada	Abbadid Taifa of Seville

Commanders and leaders
Badis ibn Habus	Al-Mu'tamid ibn Abbad

Strength
Unknown	Unknown

Casualties and losses
Unknown	Unknown

The Siege of Málaga (1065-1066) was a military conflict that took place between the year 1065 and 1066 in the city of Málaga that was under the rule of the Taifa of Granada, between the Taifa of Seville forces commanded by the Abbadid dynasty Prince Al-Mu'tamid ibn Abbad and the Taifa of Granada under the rule of Badis ibn Habus. The siege led by Al-Mu'tamid was to support an Arab uprising in the city against Berber rule, Al-Mu'tamid ibn Abbad captured the city without its citadel offering its garrison time to be reinforced from Granada under Badis ibn Habus, which drove away the Abbadids restoring the city once again under Zirid rule.

== Background ==
In 1056 Badis ibn Habus king of the Taifa of Granada conquered Málaga from the Hammudid dynasty , Sanhaji control over the city stayed nominal, this encouraged the Arabs to set up an uprising against Badis ibn Habus in 1065, they sought the help of Abbad II al-Mu'tadid king of the Taifa of Seville who sent his son Al-Mu'tamid ibn Abbad to Málaga.

== Siege and Capture of Málaga ==
Al-Mu'tamid ibn Abbad besieged Málaga, the city fell without difficulty, but the Abbadid prince neglected the siege of its citadel, and relied instead on his berber generals who assured him that the citadel would surrender of its own accord and advised him to divert himself with feasting and carousing.

== Zirid intervention and Recapture ==
The garrison troops of the citadel who were mostly black African slaves, managed to inform Badis ibn Habus of the attack, he sent strong reinforcements and fresh troops that were able to enter Málaga unopposed and thus to recapture the city.

== Aftermath ==
Al-Mu'tamid ibn Abbad failed to defend the city, and retreated to Ronda where he sought refuge in fear from his father wrath, and wrote to him poems to pardon him, however, some sources says that the father Abbad II al-Mu'tadid ordered his son to be imprisoned, and from prison where he wrote poems to him.
