= Ben-Sasson =

Ben-Sasson is a surname. Notable people with the surname include:

- Hayim Hillel Ben-Sasson (1914–1977), professor of Jewish medieval history at Hebrew University and the editor of "History of the Jewish People"
- Menachem Ben-Sasson (born 1951), Israeli politician and a former member of the Knesset for Kadima, and President of Hebrew University of Jerusalem
