= Battle of Écija (1039) =

1039 battle near Écija in Spain

- The Taifa kingdoms in 1037
| Date | 3 October 1039 |
| Location | Écija |
| Result | Coalition victory |

Belligerents
| Zirid Taifa of Granada; Taifa of Carmona; Taifa of Málaga | Abbadid Taifa of Seville |

Commanders and leaders
| Badis ibn Habus; Samuel ibn Naghrela; Idris I al-Muta'ayyad; Muhammad ibn Abdallah al-Birzali | Ismail ibn Abbad † |

Strength
| Unknown | Unknown |

Casualties and losses
| Unknown | Unknown |

The Battle of Écija (1039) took place near Écija on 3 October 1039. The forces of the Taifa of Seville led by Ismail ibn Abbad fought the allied forces of the Taifa of Málaga, Taifa of Granada and the Taifa of Carmona. The battle was a response to the Abbadid dynasty expansionist policies in the neighboring Taifas territories. The battle ended with a coalition victory and the death of Ismail ibn Abbad.

== Background ==
In order to conquer the neighboring cities of Seville ruled by the false Hisham II, Ismail ibn Muhammad ibn Abbad launched a campaign in which he defeated and executed Yahya ibn Ali ibn Hammud al-Mu'tali in 1036. Some sources say that Yahya was preparing a siege on Seville from Carmona. Once he left the city to reconnoiter, he was ambushed and killed^{.} Ibn Abbad then attacked his former ally Muhammad ibn Abdallah al-Birzali and seized Osuna and Écija, eventually besieging Carmona. Muhammad al-Birzali feared the Abbadid expansionist campaign and an anti-Abbadid coalition formed with Badis ibn Habus, king of the Taifa of Granada and Idris I al-Muta'ayyad, king of the Taifa of Málaga.

== Battle ==
The allies were led by Badis ibn Habus and his vizier Samuel ibn Naghrillah. They confronted Ismail ibn Abbad near Écija, where the latter was defeated and killed, ending his campaign in the region.

== Aftermath ==
The towns of Osuna and Écija were likely re-captured by Muhammad ibn Abdallah al-Birzali. He continued his reign in Carmona until he was defeated and killed by Samuel ibn Naghrillah's Taifa of Granada forces, adding Écija to the realm of Badis ibn Habus kingdom in 1044.
