= Badis ibn Habus =

King of the Zirid dynasty of Granada

- Zirid king of Granada
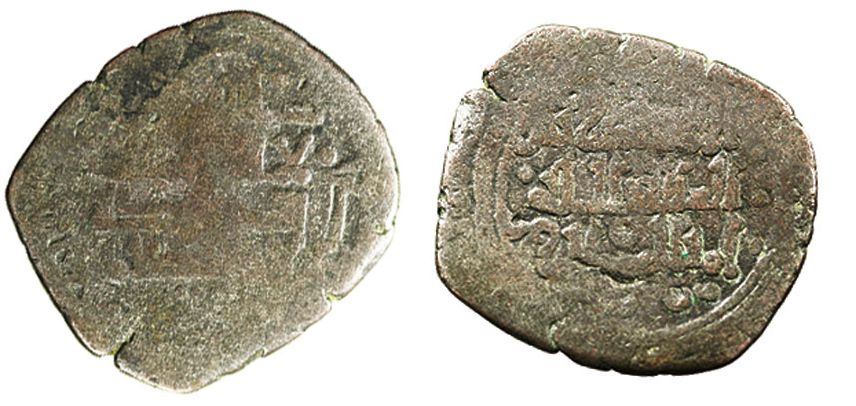
- Dirham of Badis ben Habus.

Zirid King of Granada
- Reign: 1038 – 30 June 1073
- Predecessor: Habbus al-Muzaffar
- Successor: Abdallah ibn Buluggin
- Born: 1002; Unknown
- Died: 30 June 1073 (aged 70–71); Granada
Names
- Badis ibn Habbus ibn Maksen ibn Menad as-Sanhaji
- Arabic: باديس بن حبوس
- Dynasty: Zirids
- Father: Habbus al-Muzaffar
- Religion: Islam
- Military career
- Conflicts: Battle of al-Funt (1038); Battle of Écija (1039); Battle of Arjona (1041); Battle of Lorca (1042); Zirid conquest of Málaga; Siege of Málaga (1065-1066)

Badis ibn Habus (Arabic: باديس بن حبوس) was the third Berber king of the Taifa of Granada. He ruled between 1038 and 1073.

== Biography ==
A member of the Berber Zirid dynasty, Badis ibn Habus succeeded to the throne of the Taifa of Granada upon the death of his father, Habbus al-Muzaffar, in spite of a conspiracy on the part of the Granada court that supported his cousin Yaddair ben Hubasa as a successor to Habbus. The plot failed, however, thanks to Habbus's vizier, the Jew, Samuel ibn Naghrillah, who made certain that Badis succeeded Habbus, thus reinforcing his own position in the kingdom.

In 1038, following a confrontation with Zuhayr, the king of the Taifa of Almería, Badis ibn Habus took control of the territory of the Taifa of Almeria and the following year managed to curb the expansionist ambitions of the king of the Taifa of Seville, Abu al-Qasim, whom he defeated in battle at Écija, in alliance with the Taifa of Málaga and the Badajoz.

In 1057, Badis ibn Habus won the Taifa of Málaga, annexing that kingdom and installing his firstborn son, Buluggin ibn Badis, as its governor. Nevertheless, Buluggin ibn Badis would not succeed his father as head of the Taifa of Granada, since he died in 1064 as a result of poisoning. The death of the firstborn placed Badis ibn Habus's second child, Maksan ibn Badis, as heir to the throne.

After the death of the vizier Joseph ibn Nagrela, the position of vizier to the king was occupied by the Arab Al-Naya. After Al-Naya's assassination by Abu-l-Rabbi, a Mozárab, Abu-l-Rabbi successfully maneuvered Badis ibn Habus to appoint his grandson Abdallah ibn Buluggin as his successor, rather than his son Maksan, who had lost Jaén at the hands of the Taifa of Seville, and was a refugee in the Taifa of Toledo. Abdallah ibn Buluggin finally succeeded Badis when he died in June 1073.

Preceded by Habbus al-Muzaffar	Zirid dynasty Taifa kings of Granada; 1038-1073	Succeeded by Abdallah ibn Buluggin

Preceded by Yahya III al-Mahdi	Zirid dynasty Taifa kings of Malaga; 1057-1073	Succeeded by Tamim ibn Buluggin
