= Battle of Lorca (1042) =

1042 battle in Spain

- The Taifa kingdoms in 1037
Date	1042
Location	Lorca
Result	Zirid victory: Independence of the Taifa of Almería from the Taifa of Valencia

Belligerents
Zirid Taifa of Granada	Taifa of Valencia; Taifa of Dénia; Catalan mercenaries

Commanders and leaders
Badis ibn Habus; Samuel ibn Naghrela	Abd al-Aziz al-Mansur; Mujahid al-Muwaffaq

Strength
Unknown	Unknown

Casualties and losses
Unknown	Unknown

the Battle of Lorca (1042) was a battle that took place near the city of Lorca between the forces of the Taifa of Granada led by Samuel ibn Naghrillah and the combined forces of the Taifa of Valencia, the Taifa of Dénia and the Catalan mercenaries, it resulted in a decisive victory for the Zirid Taifa of Granada.

== Background ==
In 1042, the Vizier of Almería Abu'l-Ahwas al-Mu'tasim Ma'n ibn Sumàdih led a revolt against the king of the Taifa of Valencia Abd al-Aziz al-Mansur, enlisting the aid of the Taifa of Granada king Badis ibn Habus, Badis accepted and sent forces led by his Vizier Samuel ibn Naghrillah.

== Battle ==
Samuel crossed the mountains to Guadix and Baeza, when the combined forces reached Lorca, a quarrel broke out and the forces of the Taifa of Dénia and the Catalan mercenaries left, leaving the tired Taifa of Valencia forces alone, Samuel ibn Naghrillah had an easy victory against them.

== Aftermath ==
the Vizier of Almería Abu-l-Àhwas M'an ibn Sumàdih secured his independence in the city from the Taifa of Valencia. taking Almería under the Taifa of Granada influence.
