= Zirid conquest of Málaga =

Zirid Conquest of Málaga
Date	1056
Location	Spain
Result	Zirid Victory • Badis Ibn Habus annexes the Taifa of Málaga

Belligerents
Zirids of Granada	Hammudid Dynasty

Commanders and leaders
Badis Ibn Habus	Yahya III al-Mahdi

Units involved
Unknown	Unknown

Casualties and losses
Unknown	Unknown

The Zirid conquest of Málaga occurred in 1056 between the Zirid Taifa of Granada and the Hammudid Taifa of Málaga.

Badis Ibn Habus marched against the King of Málaga and defeated him in battle successfully annexing his Kingdom. After this victory Badis Ibn Habus installed his brother Tamim as the governor of Málaga.
