= Battle of Sagrajas =

1086 battle of the Spanish Reconquista

- Part of the Reconquista
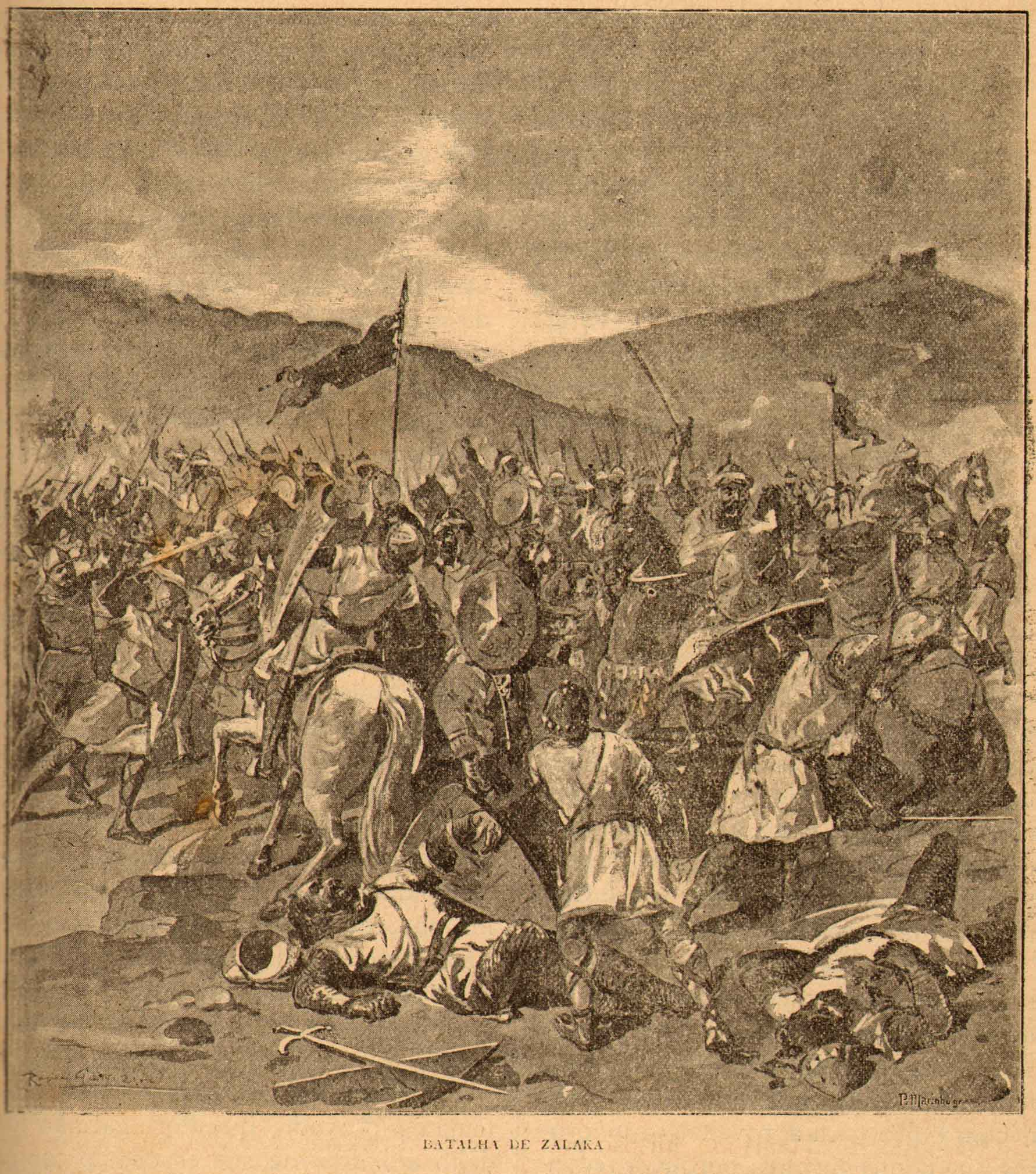
- Battle of Sagrajas
Date	23 October 1086
Location	North of Badajoz
Result	Muslim Coalition victory

Belligerents
Kingdom of León; Kingdom of Castile; Kingdom of Aragon	Almoravids; Taifa of Seville; Taifa of Badajoz; Taifa of Granada; Taifa of Málaga; Taifa of Albarracín

Commanders and leaders
Alfonso VI (WIA); Álvar Fáñez; Rodrigo Muñoz †; Vela Ovéquiz †; Sancho Ramírez of Aragon	Yusuf ibn Tashfin; Al Mu'tamid ibn Abbad of Seville; Umar ibn Muhammad al-Mutawakkil of Badajoz; Abdallah ibn Buluggin of Granada; Tamim of Málaga

Strength
Muslim Sources: 60,000-80,000 English Sources: 80,000 Spanish Sources: 2,500	Muslim Sources: 48,000 English Sources: 25,000 Spanish Sources: 7,500 (Note: Reportedly 3 times larger than Castilian army)

Casualties and losses
Muslim Sources: only 500 survived English Sources: 24,000 dead Spanish Sources: 1,250 dead (Note: Total destruction of the Christian force but 500 cavalrymen, who fled and survived)	Average casualties (Note: Muslim sources state average casualties)

The Battle of Sagrajas (23 October 1086), also called Zalaca or Zallaqah (Arabic: معركة الزلاقة, romanized: Maʿrakat az-Zallāqah), was a conflict fought in 1086 between the Almoravid army, led by their king, Yusuf ibn Tashfin, and the forces of King Alfonso VI of Castile. The Almoravids were called into battle by the taifas, Muslim principalities in Al-Andalus that often fought amongst themselves but united against the expanding Christian kingdoms to the north. In addition to the Almoravid forces, the Taifas, bolstered the Muslim side, tilting the battle in their favor. The battlefield became known as az-Zallaqah (meaning "slippery ground") due to the immense bloodshed that made the terrain treacherous, giving rise to its name in Arabic.

== History ==
=== Status of al-Andalus ===
After the death of Al-Muzaffar ibn Al-Mansur ibn Abi Amir in 399 AH, his brother Abd al-Rahman Sanchuelo assumed the position of hajib (chancellor) of the Umayyad state in Al-Andalus. Within months, Sanchuelo forced the caliph, Hisham II al-Mu'ayyad bi-Allah, to name him as the heir to the caliphate. This unprecedented move angered the Umayyad princes, who began conspiring to regain control of the government.

Ultimately, Muhammad al-Mahdi Billah succeeded in killing Sanchuelo, deposing Hisham II, and declaring himself Caliph of Al-Andalus. This event marked the beginning of a turbulent period of civil strife known as the Fitna of Al-Andalus, which lasted until 422 AH. The conflict led to the disintegration of the caliphate into smaller, independent states called the Taifa kingdoms.

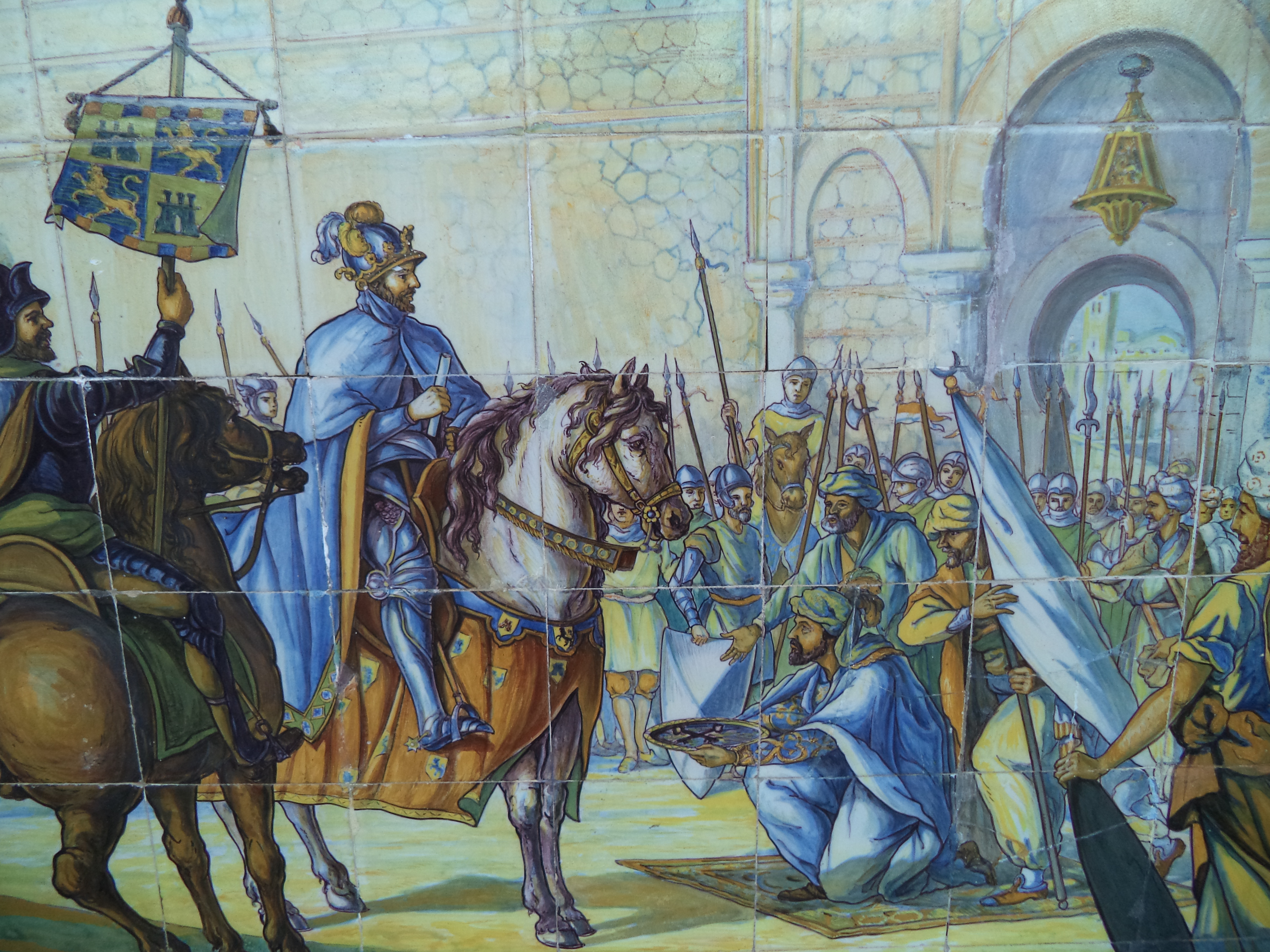
Painting of King Alfonso entering Toledo.

Among the most prominent of these were the Hammudid dynasty, who ruled Málaga and Algeciras in the south; the Banu Abbadid in Seville, the most powerful of the Taifa kings; the Dhulnunid dynasty in Toledo; the Banu Hud in Zaragoza in the north; and the Banu Amir in Valencia and Murcia in the east.

In the second half of the 11th century CE, the Muslim rulers of Al-Andalus were deeply divided and often more hostile towards each other than towards their Christian adversaries. Many of these rulers sought alliances with the Christian kingdoms of the north, sometimes agreeing to pay tribute in exchange for military support. A notable conflict arose between the Taifa of Toledo and the Taifa of Córdoba, initially involving the rulers of Toledo, Córdoba, and Seville. This struggle persisted for years until Al-Mamun ibn Dhul-Nun, the ruler of Toledo, allied with Ferdinand I, the King of León and Castile, which enabled him to capture Valencia.

At the same time, Al-Mu'tamid ibn Abbad, the ruler of Seville, expanded his territory by seizing Murcia, Orihuela, and other cities. Al-Mu'tamid then allied with Alfonso VI, the Kingdom of Castile, securing military assistance against other Taifa rulers in exchange for paying tribute to Castile. One of the results of this alliance was Alfonso VI's capture of Toledo—the former Visigothic capital—in 478 AH (1085 CE), just a year before the Battle of Sagrajas (Zallaqa). The fall of Toledo marked a permanent loss for the Muslims, who had ruled the city for 372 years. Alfonso VI subsequently made Toledo the capital of Castile, establishing it as a Christian stronghold.

The fall of Toledo was a devastating blow to the alliance between Alfonso VI and Al-Mu'tamid, the ruler of Seville. Alfonso was not content with just Toledo; he also seized all the lands along both banks of the Tagus River, including the fortresses of Madrid, Mérida, and Badajoz. Alarmed by this expansion, Al-Mu'tamid wrote to Alfonso warning him not to extend his conquests beyond Toledo, stating that such actions would be considered a breach of their agreement. However, Alfonso paid no heed to Al-Mu'tamid's warnings and continued his conquests, with the intention of subjugating all the Muslim emirates.

The Taifa of Zaragoza soon faced the same threat that had befallen Toledo, prompting most Muslim rulers in Al-Andalus to conclude that there was no refuge from Alfonso except by seeking the help of the Almoravids in North Africa.

=== The status of the Christian kingdoms of northern Iberia ===
Alfonso VI, King of Castile, who ruled over Galicia, parts of Portugal, Asturias, Lyon, and Biscay, joined forces with Sancho I, King of Aragon and Navarre, and Count Berengar Raymond of Barcelona and Urgell. These Christian rulers, after years of internal conflicts, united with the goal of decisively eliminating the Islamic presence in the Iberian Peninsula, especially following the fall of Toledo. With their differences set aside, they mobilized a large, powerful army from Galicia and León, marching together to confront the Muslim forces.

The Christian coalition captured Coria from the Banu al-Aftas and advanced towards Seville, devastating its surrounding villages and fields. A cavalry unit pushed as far south as Sidonia and even reached Tarifa, the southernmost tip of Spain near the Strait of Gibraltar. Alfonso’s forces, bolstered by troops from Aragon and Catalonia, laid siege to the fortified city of Zaragoza. Had Zaragoza fallen, Alfonso VI would have gained control over the Ebro River basin, leaving the Mediterranean coastline vulnerable to his raids. Despite the relentless pressure, the fortified Islamic defenses of Zaragoza held firm, resisting the Christian advance day by day.

=== Status of the Almoravids ===
The Almoravids, originally referred to as the "Veiled Ones," were the foundation of an Islamic reform movement that emerged from the call of Sheikh Abdallah ibn Yasin and the influence of the Sanhaja tribes, particularly the Lamtuna and Judala. This movement was established on a Sunni Maliki Islamic doctrine. After Ibn Yasin's death, leadership of the Almoravid state transitioned to Abu Bakr ibn Umar, who delegated governance to Yusuf ibn Tashfin while addressing a conflict in the Moroccan desert.

Upon Abu Bakr's return several years later, he found that the situation had stabilized under Yusuf's control, leading him to relinquish the throne to Yusuf. Yusuf successfully consolidated his authority across the western Maghreb, unifying the region under a central power. He entered Fez in 455 AH (1063 CE) and subsequently captured Tlemcen, Tangier, and Ceuta. In 454 AH (1062 CE), Ibn Tashfin founded the city of Marrakesh, designating it as the capital of the Almoravid state and transforming it into a formidable military base.

Through these efforts, Yusuf ibn Tashfin established control over the Maghreb, extending his dominion from the territories of the Banu Mazghena in Algeria to Tangier, the far reaches of Sous, and into the Gold Mountains of Sudan.

The Almoravids were the first ruling dynasty in Morocco to use a large number of black slaves in the army, beginning in the 11th century. According to Ibn 'Idhari, in the year 1071-1072 Yusuf Ibn Tashfin "bought a body of black slaves and sent them to al-Andalus", where he "gave them all mounts", adding some 2,000 of them to the Almoravid cavalry. However, the 4,000 black soldiers in this battle are referred to as "hasham" by Ibn Khallikan, a term used for paid mercenaries, suggesting they may not have been slaves. Historian Umar al-Naqar states that the troops may have been from the kingdom of Takrur, a Muslim state around the Senegal River that may have been allied with the Almoravids in prior years.

== Andalusis call on the Almoravids ==
By the end of the Taifa period in Al-Andalus, the region faced challenges due to internal conflicts and the submission of Muslim rulers to their Christian enemies in the north. The policies of the Taifa kings, marked by division and dependency on external powers, had weakened the Muslim states. In response to their deteriorating situation, many Andalusians began considering external assistance to defend their territories. The idea of seeking help from Yusuf ibn Tashfin, the leader of the Almoravids, gained popularity. Supporters of this plan traveled across the sea to Marrakesh, where they appealed to Yusuf, describing the hardships and oppression they endured from the advancing Christian forces.

The city of Marrakesh became a key destination for delegations from Al-Andalus, who viewed it as a beacon of hope and a source of strength capable of reversing their declining fortunes. These Andalusian emissaries sought the assistance of the Almoravids, believing that Marrakesh, under the leadership of Yusuf ibn Tashfin, could provide the military and political support needed to improve their deteriorating conditions and counter the growing threat from the Christian forces in the north.

=== Ibn al-Aftas's letter to Yusuf ibn Tashfin ===
Al-Mutawakkil ibn al-Aftas, the Emir of Badajoz, sent a heartfelt letter to Yusuf ibn Tashfin, detailing the dire state of affairs in Al-Andalus. In his plea, he wrote:

"Since the light of guidance is your beacon and the path of righteousness your way, it is clear that you are the greatest supporter of the Islamic state and the most capable conqueror against the infidels. It is essential for you to be summoned to address this worsening crisis and come to the aid of the Iberian Peninsula, which is engulfed in tribulation. The enemy encircles us with increasing dominance and aggression, their oppression ever more intense. Their defiance grows, while we have responded with submission, and now they are certain of our weakness. Their ambitions to conquer cities have grown, and they have ignited the fires of war everywhere. Their spears and swords are soaked with the blood of Muslims, and those who have not been killed are captives and slaves, enduring torture and tribulation. O God, and O Muslims, shall falsehood prevail over truth? Shall polytheism overpower monotheism, and disbelief triumph over faith? Is there no defender for this oppressed religion, no protector for the sanctity violated? You are most deserving of jihad according to the Book of Allah, for you are its rightful followers, and by the hadith of the Messenger of Allah, for you are the most knowledgeable of it."

He concluded by stating that the bearer of the letter, a learned preacher, would provide further elaboration. Upon receiving this plea, Yusuf ibn Tashfin honored the envoys, reassured them, and promised to provide assistance. He vowed to cross into Al-Andalus and open the path to jihad in the name of Allah once the obstacles preventing the Almoravids from advancing were cleared.

=== Ibn Abad's letter to Yusuf ibn Tashfin ===
Despite the submission of the Taifa kings to the Christian rulers of the north, their attempts to appease them through alliances and tribute payments, these efforts only served to fuel the Christians' arrogance. Al-Mu'tamid ibn Abbad, the Emir of Seville, found himself distracted by one of his numerous wars, causing him to miss the payment of tribute to Alfonso VI, King of Castile. When he eventually managed to send the payment, Alfonso was infuriated. In addition to the tribute, Alfonso demanded control over certain fortresses and made further unreasonable demands, including the request that his wife give birth inside the Great Mosque of Córdoba, as she was pregnant at the time.

In response to this escalating pressure, in 475 AH (1082 AD), Al-Mu'tamid wrote to Yusuf ibn Tashfin, describing the dire situation in Al-Andalus and the worsening state of the Muslims, as Christian forces had taken control of much of their territory. He implored Yusuf for help in repelling the aggression. Yusuf replied: "Once God grants me the conquest of Ceuta, I shall join you, and I will exert all efforts in the jihad against the enemy."

=== Alfonso's letter to al-Mu'adh ibn Abad ===
Alfonso VI, King of Castile, sent a letter to Al-Mu'tamid ibn Abbad, the Emir of Seville, which was recorded in Arabic sources as follows:

"From the two-faced (qenbitor) king, the favored, al-Dhifti, son of Shanjar, to Al-Mu'tamid Billah, may God guide his opinions. You have witnessed what has befallen Toledo and its regions, and the fate of its people during its siege. You have surrendered your brethren and idled away your time in complacency, without being vigilant against the one who is awakening (the enemy) before falling into their traps. Had it not been for a covenant between us that we must uphold, and a commitment to the light of fidelity before us, we would have risen against you with determination, accompanied by a herald of invasion. However, this warning interrupts any excuses. We have brought this message to you from the illustrious Qarmati, who possesses the wisdom to deal with someone of your stature and the intellect to govern your lands and your men, regarding what is essential and what is to be amended, not what is detrimental. You will be coming to him with your opinions, and then the examination will be from behind you. Peace be upon you, with your right hand and before you."

In response, Al-Mu'tamid ibn Abbad wrote:

"Peace be upon those who follow the guidance. As for what follows: The first point we make in your claim is that you are the one with two faces, while the Muslims are more deserving of this title. For what they possess of lands and great preparation and the tribute to the kingdom, your power cannot claim or your creed recognize. The call to battle has roused those who have long been complacent, and the beloved may arise from the despised, with regret stemming from haste in the undertaking. I have awakened from a long negligence, and I have stirred from a slumber that had renewed its peace. When have your ancestors had a hand in cooperation with our noble ancestors, except for the disgrace you should understand the extent of and realize its consequences? What has emboldened you to request what a people like yours cannot grasp? They do not fight you all except in fortified villages or behind walls. There was a state of peace between us and you that necessitated refraining from aiding them and managing their affairs. We ask God for forgiveness for what we have done to ourselves and them, and for the abandonment of prudence and the submission of their cause to their enemies. Praise be to God, who has made our punishment your rebuke and scolding, as death is less than that. Peace be upon those who know the truth and follow it, and avoid falsehood and its deception."

Al-Mu'tamid ibn Abbad had agreed with Alfonso VI to pay an annual tribute. To facilitate this, Alfonso dispatched a caravan of five hundred knights, led by his Jewish minister, Ibn Shalib, to collect the payment. Upon their arrival at the outskirts of Seville, Al-Mu'tamid welcomed the caravan and sent the tribute. However, Ibn Shalib refused to accept the money, insisting, "By God, I will only take it in gold coins," and further insulted the Andalusians with disrespectful remarks.

Upon hearing of this affront, Al-Mu'tamid summoned his slaves and some of his soldiers, ordering them to kill Alfonso's minister and capture those accompanying him. They executed his orders promptly.

=== Cordoba conference ===
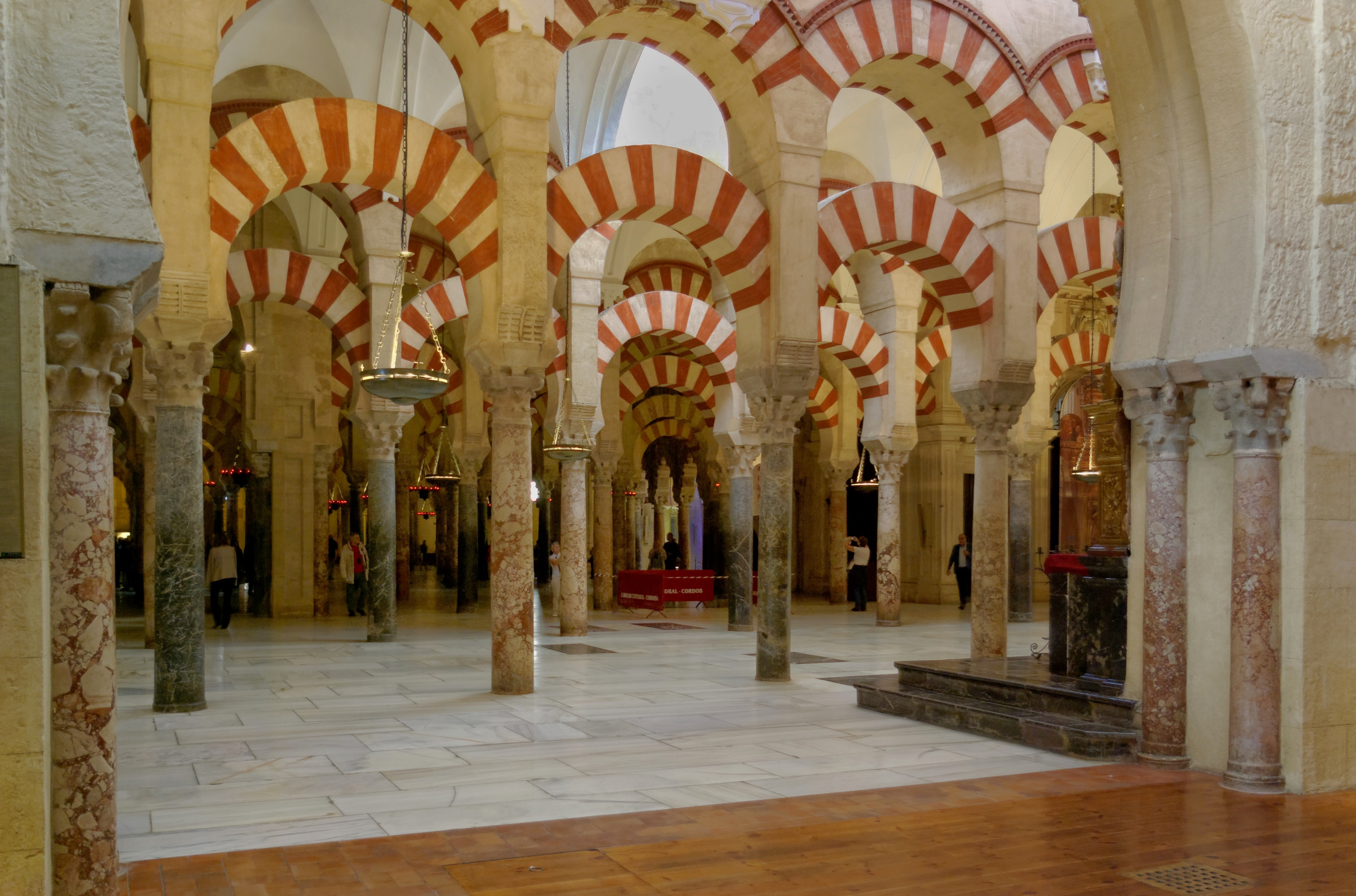
Cordoba Mosque.

As news of the murder of Alfonso VI's minister spread, the people of Al-Andalus recognized the seriousness of their predicament, especially given the inability of the Taifa kings to fend off the growing threat from the Christian kingdoms. In response, a popular conference was convened in Córdoba, attended by a group of Andalusian leaders, who met with Judge Ubayd Allah ibn Muhammad ibn Adham. They expressed their concerns, stating, "Do you not see the humiliation and disgrace that Muslims are enduring, paying tribute after once receiving it? The Franks have overwhelmed the land, leaving only a small portion. If this continues, it will revert to Christianity. We have an idea to propose to you." When asked what it was, they replied, "Let us write to the Arabs of Africa, offering them half our wealth upon their arrival, and we shall join them as warriors in the cause of God."

In response, Ibn Adham suggested, "The Almoravids are better and closer to us." The leaders then decided to write to Yusuf ibn Tashfin, requesting his assistance and passage to Al-Andalus. Shortly thereafter, Al-Mu'tamid ibn Abbad arrived in Córdoba and met with Judge Ibn Adham, informing him of the people's demand for support from the Almoravids and the urgent need for military preparations against the Christian threat. Given the severe military pressure exerted by Alfonso, they felt compelled to reach out to Yusuf ibn Tashfin for help. Al-Mu'tamid appointed Ibn Adham as his messenger to Tashfin, and the judge agreed to this important task. Thus, the decision to formally request assistance from the Almoravids was finalized.

Meanwhile, upon learning of his minister's murder and the events surrounding his envoy, Alfonso swore by his gods that he would not rest until he avenged his minister. He vowed to gather a force as numerous as the hairs on his head and march them to the sea of Zuqaq.

=== Alfonso's letter to Yusuf ibn Tashfin ===
Alfonso VI executed his plan to invade the Muslim territories, laying siege to Ibn Abbad in his palace. During this period, Alfonso sent a mocking letter to Ibn Abbad, stating, "My lengthy stay has caused an abundance of flies in my council, and the heat has become unbearable. Please send me a fan from your palace so that I may refresh myself and drive the flies away."

In response, Ibn Abbad adopted a tone of defiance and determination, clearly distancing himself from any notion of submission. He penned a reply directly on the back of Alfonso's letter: "I have read your letter and understood your arrogance and self-importance. I will arrange for fans made from the hides of your defeated armies to be brought to you; they will cool you off, but not in your favor, God willing."

Understanding Ibn Abbad's intent in his response, Alfonso sought to adopt a similar tone in his communication with Yusuf ibn Tashfin. He wrote a letter stating: "From the Prince of Christianity, Alfonso, son of Ferdinand, to Yusuf ibn Tashfin. To begin with, you are now the Prince of the Muslims in the land of Morocco and their Sultan. The people of Andalusia have become weak in resisting and confronting me, and I have humbled them by taking their lands. It is your duty to aid them, as they belong to your faith. Either you come to me or send ships so that I may come to you. If I defeat you, the kingdoms of Andalusia and Morocco will be yours; if you defeat me, then their hopes for your assistance will be extinguished, as their hearts are set on your aid."

Upon receiving Alfonso's letter, Yusuf instructed his scribe to respond. The scribe wrote a detailed reply addressing each point raised in Alfonso's correspondence. However, after reviewing the response, Yusuf felt it was overly lengthy and ordered his scribe to write a succinct message on the back of Alfonso's letter: "From the Prince of the Muslims, Yusuf, to Alfonso. As for your letter, the answer is what you will see with your own eyes, not what you hear with your ears. Peace be upon those who follow guidance."

=== Ibn Abad's letter to Yusuf ibn Tashfin ===
On the first of Jumada al-Awwal in the year 479 AH, Ibn Abbad sent a message to Ibn Tashfin: "To the esteemed Imam and Commander of the Muslims, we, the Arabs in this Andalusia, have been scattered, and our tribes have disbanded. The accursed enemy, Alfonso, has attacked us, capturing Muslims and seizing our lands, fortresses, and castles. We are powerless to assist our neighbors or our brothers. The situation has worsened, and all hope is lost. You, may God support you, are the King of Morocco; I seek refuge in God, then in you, to come forth and wage jihad against this infidel enemy. Peace be upon your highness, and may God's mercy and blessings be upon you."

Upon receiving the letter, Ibn Tashfin honored its bearers and consulted his leaders and princes, who advised him to cross into Andalusia. He then sent a reply to Ibn Abbad: "From the Commander of the Muslims to Ibn Abbad, peace, mercy, and blessings be upon you. I have received your esteemed letter and have noted your call for our assistance and the troubles you are facing. We are committed to your support and protection. However, we can only cross if you surrender the Green Island (Algeciras) to us, so it can serve as a base for our operations against the enemy whenever we wish. If you agree to this, please affirm it yourself. Peace, mercy, and blessings be upon you."

Ibn Abbad agreed to hand over the city to the Almoravids, paving the way for their crossing into Andalusia.

== Crossing to al-Andalus ==
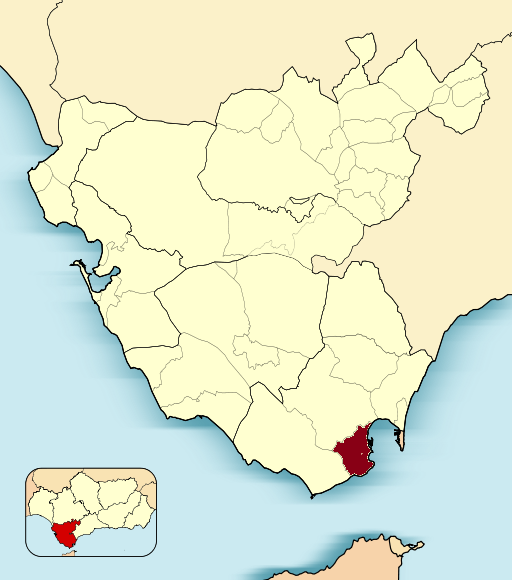
Al Jazeera Al Akhdar is home to the Almoravid camp.

After Al-Mu'tamid ibn Abbad agreed to surrender the island of Al-Jazira Al-Khadra (the Green Island) to the Almoravids, Yusuf ibn Tashfin ordered the mobilization of five hundred knights to serve as an advance contingent for the main army's crossing into Al-Andalus. These knights gathered on the island, establishing a camp in the Dar Al-Sina'a (House of Industry) under the leadership of Dawud ibn Aisha, who ensured the island was guarded on all sides.

Dawud ibn Aisha subsequently contacted Al-Mu'tamid to inform him of their arrival and requested the evacuation of the island as previously agreed with Yusuf ibn Tashfin. After some initial hesitation, Al-Mu'tamid decided to honor the commitment made during his diplomatic missions to Marrakech. He sent a message to Yusuf ibn Tashfin stating, “We have relieved you of the burden of provisions and sending supplies to our troops as promised.”

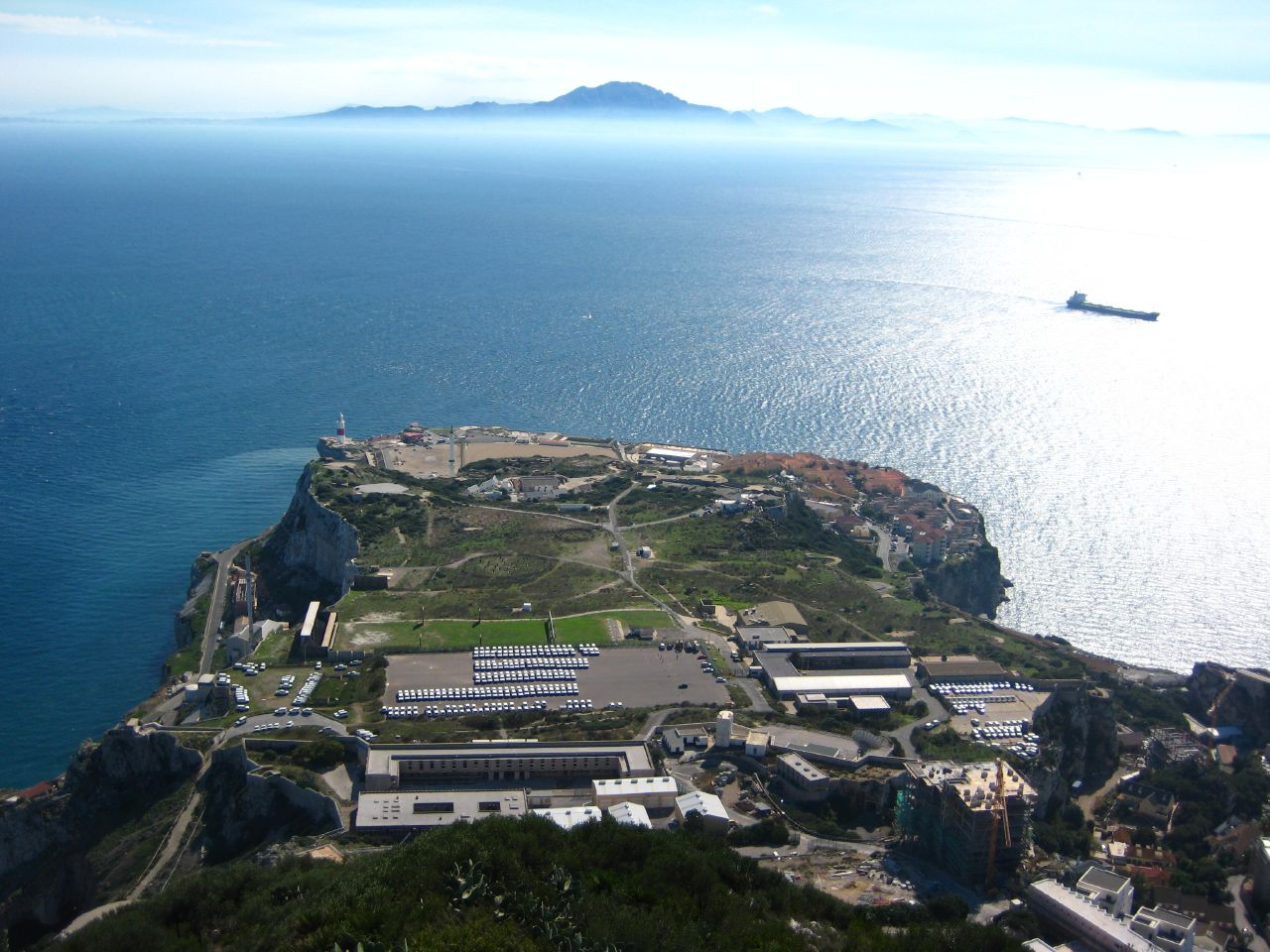
The strait through which the Almoravids crossed into Iberia.

In response, Al-Mu'tamid instructed his son, Al-Radi ibn Al-Mu'tamid, who was then the governor of Al-Jazira Al-Khadra, to evacuate the island immediately for the Almoravids. Upon entering the island, the Almoravids restored order, having initially harbored doubts due to Al-Mu'tamid's delay in vacating the area. Subsequently, the Almoravid contingents set sail across the sea towards Al-Andalus, chanting praises and accompanied by groups of fighters who had joined them following Ibn Tashfin's call to jihad.

Ibn Al-Kurdubus noted, “He sincerely dedicated his intentions to God, filled the sea with fleets, and allowed groups to cross one after another, occupying Al-Jazira Al-Khadra with his green battalion, which included twelve thousand riders from the elite of the troops.”

When Yusuf ibn Tashfin boarded the ship bound for Al-Andalus, he prayed, “O Allah, if you know that my crossing is for the good and welfare of the Muslims, make my passage across this sea easy. If not, then make it difficult for me so that I do not cross.” He also ordered the transportation of camels from Morocco to Al-Andalus for military purposes, causing the desert to fill with their numbers and the sound of their grunting rising to the heavens. The inhabitants of the island had never seen such animals before, nor had their horses encountered their forms or sounds, which caused panic and unease among the horses. This was precisely Yusuf ibn Tashfin's intention, as it aimed to deter the Frankish cavalry during the upcoming battle.

With this, the Almoravid forces completed their crossing into Al-Andalus, settling in Al-Jazira Al-Khadra and positioning themselves close to the battlefield. Meanwhile, the Castilian forces were conducting raids across various locations in Al-Andalus, inflicting destruction before returning to Alfonso. In response, Ibn Tashfin ordered the fortification of Al-Jazira Al-Khadra, stockpiling weapons, ammunition, and food, while reinforcing its defenses to serve as a stronghold and secure point of contact between Al-Andalus and Morocco.

Among those who welcomed Ibn Tashfin were the judge Abu Al-Walid Al-Baji and numerous scholars. The people of Al-Andalus rejoiced at the arrival of the Almoravids and their leader, paving the way for the Almoravid presence in the region. Upon learning of Ibn Tashfin's arrival at Al-Jazira Al-Khadra, Al-Mu'tamid sent his son to meet him while he focused on securing provisions for the army. The poet Al-Hamiri noted, “He ordered the citizens to bring food and hospitality, and Yusuf was pleased and energized by this.”

Al-Mu'tamid then commanded his troops to prepare for battle alongside the mujahideen. He went to meet Ibn Tashfin, and the two encountered each other in Ibn Tashfin's camp. All the kings of the Taifa kingdoms in Al-Andalus hastened to assist and join the gathering. Once preparations were complete and the soldiers were ready to move under Ibn Tashfin’s command, Al-Mu'tamid suggested heading to Seville for rest after their long journey. However, Ibn Tashfin refused, stating, “I have come with the intention of fighting the enemy; wherever the enemy is, that is where I will head.”

== Preparing for battle ==
The march of the Almoravid army from the Ouest Maghreb to Zallaqa.

Yusuf ibn Tashfin led the Islamic armies gathered in Algeciras, which had been granted to him by Ibn Abbad to serve as a base for his troops, a center for communication and supply for the mujahideen, and a secure route for their return. In the heat of preparations for battle, Ibn Tashfin declared, "I am the first to volunteer for the support of this religion, and no one will lead this matter except for myself."

The forces of Ibn Abbad, the Emir of Seville, along with troops from Ibn Sumadih, the Emir of Almería, and Abdallah ibn Buluggin, the Emir of Granada, joined the camp of the Almoravids, accompanied by his brother Tamīm, the Emir of Málaga. Yahya al-Qadir and al-Mutawakkil ibn al-Aftas also arrived. Ibn Tashfin instructed them to camp with Ibn Abbad, resulting in the Muslims being divided into two camps: the Andalusian camp and the Almoravid camp.

The overall commander of the Andalusian forces was Al-Mu'tamid ibn Abbad, who organized the Muslim army as follows: the vanguard was led by Al-Mu'tamid himself, assisted by Abu Sulayman Dawud ibn Aisha, comprising ten thousand cavalry from the Almoravids. The right flank was commanded by Al-Mutawakkil 'ala Allah Umar ibn al-Aftas, the Emir of Batalyaws, while the left flank consisted of troops from Eastern Andalusia. The rear guard was made up of the remaining forces from Andalusia, and the reserve force was commanded by the Emir of the Muslims, consisting of an elite group of Almoravid fighters from Morocco and his personal guard.

The Muslim army advanced toward the enemy, continuing until they reached the city of Batalyaws, where they were welcomed by Al-Mutawakkil ibn al-Aftas, who provided them with necessary supplies and hospitality. They eventually arrived at a plain located north of Batalyaws, near the current borders of Portugal, known in Islamic narratives as Zalaqa and referred to by the Spaniards as Sagrajas. In this plain, the leaders of Andalusia agreed to unite as one. Abdullah ibn Bulqīn, the Emir of Granada, stated: "We contracted with the Emir of the Muslims that we would work together to wage war against the Romans with his assistance, and that no one would intrude into our lands or come upon our subjects with the intention of causing corruption."

Ibn Bulqīn remarked on the atmosphere in the camp, noting: "What was remarkable during that time was the sincerity of intentions and the purity of hearts, as if the souls were united for that purpose."

News of the Murabitun crossing reached Alfonso VI while he was besieging the city of Zaragoza. This compelled him to lift the siege and focus on preparing strategies and consolidating forces. He sent messages to Ibn Rammir, who was besieging the city of Tortosa, and to Al-Barhans, the Castilian commander besieging Valencia, urging them to join him with their armies. He also dispatched calls for reinforcements to Castile, Galicia, and León, resulting in large crowds arriving from those regions.

Alfonso continued to mobilize and gather forces from across Europe, receiving reinforcements until he had completed his military preparations. He set out with troops and equipment, climbing a hill with a group of his leaders to survey his armies. He was impressed by the sight of their numbers and the gleam of their armor, remarking to his cousin Garcia, “Today we shall achieve victory over the Muslims.”

Alfonso continued his march towards Batalyaws, where the plain of Zalaqa and the Muslim army awaited him. Confident in his ability to secure victory due to the size of his forces and their equipment, he boldly declared, “With these, I will fight against men, jinn, and the angels of heaven.”

=== Choosing the location ===
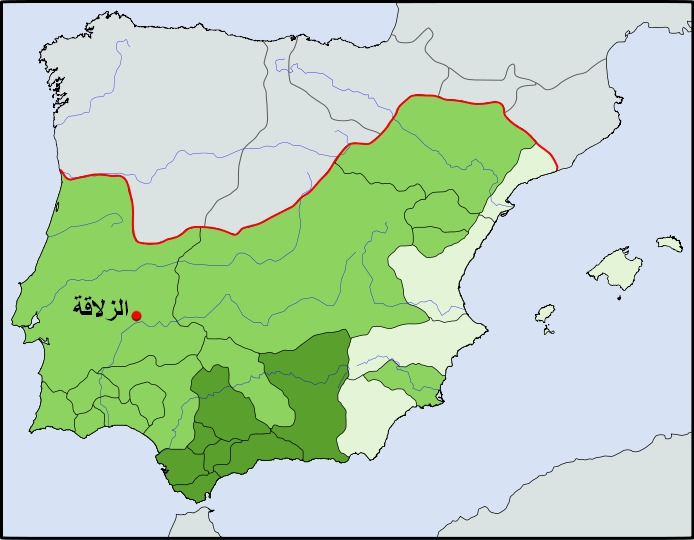
Zallaqa Plain on map.

Muslim forces, led by Yusuf ibn Tashfin, chose the city of Badajoz as their base of operations, halting there on Ibn Tashfin's orders. His strategy was to lure the Castilian army out of their fortified positions and engage them on unfamiliar terrain. While the battlefield was unknown to the Castilians, it was familiar to the Muslims, providing them with a strategic advantage. This tactical decision was aimed at weakening the enemy by drawing them into a less defensible environment, where the Muslims could capitalize on their knowledge of the area.

Alfonso VI accepted Yusuf ibn Tashfin's choice of the plain of Al-Zallaqah as the battlefield. After consulting with his commanders, Alfonso decided to march towards Al-Zallaqah, aiming to confront the Muslim forces on their own land. This bold move was intended to display confidence and undermine the morale of the Muslim army. By advancing deep into Muslim territory, Alfonso sought to assert dominance and deliver a psychological blow, believing that such an aggressive strategy would demoralize the Muslims and give his forces a tactical advantage.

=== Letters between Ibn Tashfin and Alfonso ===
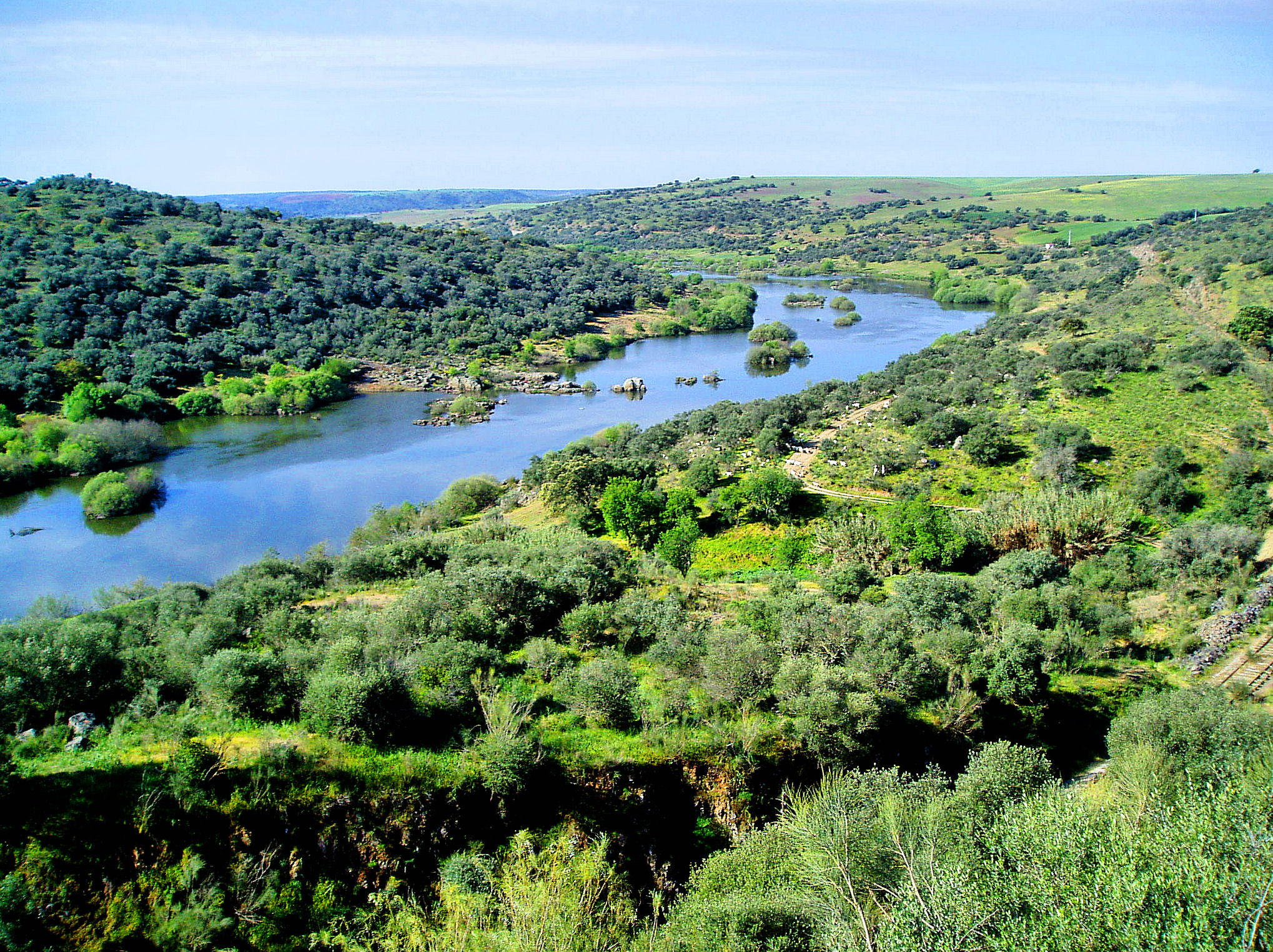
The Yana River by which the two armies camped.

Yusuf ibn Tashfin extended to Alfonso VI the traditional three choices in accordance with Islamic practice: to embrace Islam, to pay the jizya (a tax for non-Muslims under Muslim rule), or to face war. This ultimatum followed the precedent set by the Prophet Muhammad.

When Yusuf ibn Tashfin's letter reached Alfonso VI, the Christian king refused to heed the call. Alfonso rejected the offer.

In accordance with the customs of the time, it was common practice for both parties to agree upon a specific day for battle. Alfonso VI arrived at the battlefield in Rajab 479 AH (October 1086 CE) and, on Thursday, proposed that the confrontation take place on Monday. Although Yusuf ibn Tashfin and the Muslim forces suspected treachery behind Alfonso's choice of Monday, they accepted the proposal while taking precautions. They increased security measures and deployed scouts to monitor enemy movements.

This event is confirmed in a letter Yusuf ibn Tashfin wrote to al-Mu'izz ibn Badis, the ruler of Ifriqiya, following the Muslim victory at the Battle of Al-Zallaqah. In the letter, Ibn Tashfin recounts:

"We agreed to meet on Monday. Alfonso explained, 'Friday is the Muslim holiday, Saturday is the Jewish holiday (and there were many Jews in their camp), and Sunday is our holiday.' Despite this agreement, the cursed one harbored intentions to betray what had been settled. Knowing their treachery and habit of breaking oaths, we prepared for war and placed spies to watch them."

=== Mobilization of armies ===
The Islamic and Castilian armies set up camp facing each other, separated only by the river Wadi Bira, a small tributary of the larger Wadi Yana, located between the cities of Batalyus (Badajoz) and Mértola. Both armies maintained a state of heightened alert, with the Muslims finalizing their troop arrangements by placing heavy cavalry units at the forefront. These cavalry units played a crucial role in the battle, effectively absorbing the force of Alfonso's fierce attacks.

On the Castilian side, after the arrival of volunteers from southern France, Italy, and various regions including Aragon, Galicia, Asturias, and Biscay, Alfonso VI assembled his forces and formulated a military strategy. He divided his army into two main divisions. The first was led by Count García and Count Zodric, tasked with attacking the Muslim vanguard. The second division consisted of two wings led by Sancho Ramírez, the King of Aragon, and Count Raymond, with the core of the army commanded by Alfonso himself. The vanguard was directed by his commander Albaráns, primarily composed of troops from the Kingdom of Aragon.

== Battle ==
The agreement between Yusuf ibn Tashfin and Alfonso VI stipulated that the battle would take place on Monday. However, the German historian Joseph Aschbach noted that "Alfonso believed, based on a vile principle, that he was entitled to resort to any deception in war and to break a sworn pact," intending to surprise the enemy by attacking before the agreed-upon day. He aimed to employ such a ruse by choosing Friday, the Muslim holy day, for combat.

Despite the agreement to fight on Monday, the Muslims took every precaution to prepare for potential surprises, harboring suspicions about the Castilian king's intentions. Al-Mu'tamid ibn Abbad, the Amir of Seville, was well aware of Alfonso's history of deceit in warfare. Consequently, he increased surveillance around Alfonso’s camp and dispatched scouts to monitor the movements of his army.

On the morning of Friday, the 12th of Rajab 479 AH (October 23, 1086), the scouts returned to inform Al-Mu'tamid that they had heard the sounds of the armies and the clatter of weapons, confirming that Alfonso was mobilizing his forces. They reported, "We eavesdropped and heard Alfonso say to his companions: 'Ibn Abbad is the instigator of these wars. Although these desert dwellers are skilled and insightful in battle, they are unfamiliar with this land, and they are only led by Ibn Abbad. So target him and attack; be patient, for if you defeat him, the desert dwellers will become easy to overcome after him. I do not see Ibn Abbad able to withstand you if you attack him seriously.'"

Upon receiving this intelligence, Al-Mu'tamid dispatched a message, carried by Abu Bakr ibn al-Qusaira, to Commander Yusuf ibn Tashfin, informing him of Alfonso's maneuvers and the treachery regarding their agreement, urging him for support. Ibn Tashfin replied, "I will approach him, God willing." He also sent a message to Al-Ma'izz ibn Badis, updating him on the situation: "News reached us in the early hours of Friday that the enemy had targeted the Muslims, believing he had seized an opportunity. Thus, I sent the brave Muslims and the knights of the mujahideen to confront him before he could confront us."

The strength of the Muslim army's strategy lay in the reserve force planned by Amir Yusuf ibn Tashfin, consisting of the bravest fighters of the Almoravids. This reserve was designed to launch a surprise attack on Alfonso's army at the right moment, after the enemy had fatigued from combat. The plan ensured that this reserve force could overcome the enemy through surprise tactics, capitalizing on the terrain of al-Andalus, which was well-suited for ambush warfare.

=== The process of the battle ===
As both the Christian and Muslim forces prepared for battle, Christian clergymen urged the Castilian army to fight, while Muslim scholars and jurists motivated the mujahideen to engage in battle and seek martyrdom. King Alfonso VI deployed the first contingent of his troops, led by Count García and Count Zodric, to launch a surprise attack on Al-Mu'tamid ibn Abbad, the leader of the Andalusian camp, with the intent of instilling chaos and panic among the Muslim ranks.

However, the Castilian army encountered the Almoravid forces, composed of ten thousand knights under the command of Dawud ibn Aisha, before reaching the Andalusian camp. Ibn Aisha faced difficulties in withstanding the overwhelming advance and intensity of the Castilian assault. Nevertheless, his reliance on a large contingent of archers played a crucial role in repelling the initial Castilian attack, compelling them to retreat to their second line of defense. Despite this, the Almoravids suffered casualties during their effort to withstand the first wave of Alfonso's forces.

At this juncture, Al-Mu'tamid ibn Abbad's front line engaged in a battle marked by an imbalance in resources and equipment. The ferocity of the Castilian assault and the superior weaponry of their forces forced the front line to retreat from their positions. Some Andalusian leaders fled to the city of Badajoz upon recognizing their imminent defeat. However, Al-Mu'tamid and the knights of Seville managed to maintain their positions despite being encircled by thousands of Castilian troops. They fought valiantly, supported by the Almoravid knights led by Dawud ibn Aisha, who held firm against the initial onslaught of the Castilian army.

Alfonso VI sensed an impending victory as he observed the weakening resistance of Al-Mu'tamid ibn Abbad against his relentless assaults and noted the growing retreat among the Muslims of Andalusia. However, the Almoravid army, led by Yusuf ibn Tashfin, remained concealed behind a high mound, shielded from the enemy's view, with only ten thousand fighters having joined Al-Mu'tamid.

In this critical moment, Alfonso decided to attack the Almoravid forces supporting Al-Mu'tamid, specifically targeting the contingent led by Dawud ibn Aisha. The clash between the Castilian superiority and Almoravid resilience intensified, and the pressure from the Christian forces on ibn Aisha and his knights mounted. In response, ibn Aisha informed Yusuf ibn Tashfin of their dire situation. Consequently, ibn Tashfin dispatched a battalion led by his strongest commander, Amir Sir ibn Abi Bakr, accompanied by additional Almoravid troops. This battalion successfully penetrated the heart of the Castilian army, linking up with Al-Mu'tamid's forces and alleviating some of the pressure on the Andalusians, who began to regain their composure.

Despite these reinforcements, Alfonso continued to intensify his assault on Dawud ibn Aisha and his knights, advancing until he reached the tents of the Almoravids and breached the trench protecting them. Alfonso urged his soldiers forward amidst the chaos, inflicting a defeat on Al-Mu'tamid and his Andalusian forces, which compelled them to retreat, even as Almoravid reinforcements arrived.

At this juncture, the Castilians felt assured of a favorable outcome with the apparent defeat of the Andalusian and Almoravid troops and became preoccupied with pursuing Al-Mu'tamid and his forces. Seizing the opportunity, Yusuf ibn Tashfin entered the fray, devising a strategy to surprise the enemy from an unexpected angle. He advanced with his reserve forces and attacked the Castilian camp, capitalizing on the panic of the Castilian horses at the sight of the camels brought from Morocco. Ibn Tashfin set the camels ablaze, killing their guardians among the knights and soldiers, which caused the remaining Castilian troops to flee toward Alfonso.

Upon realizing the chaos that had befallen his camp and garrison, Alfonso halted his pursuit of Al-Mu'tamid and retreated to save his stronghold from disaster. Observing Alfonso's withdrawal, Al-Mu'tamid sensed the beginnings of defeat among the Castilians and ordered his companions to attack. Commander Sir ibn Abi Bakr and his men charged at Alfonso's forces, increasing the pressure and continuing the rout. At that moment, soldiers who had fled to Badajoz at the onset of the attack returned to join the fray, intensifying the assault on Alfonso and his troops until they realized their imminent annihilation.

=== Victory of Muslims ===
The Battle of Sagrajas (known to Muslims as the Battle of Al-Zallaqah) marked a victory for the Muslim forces under Yusuf ibn Tashfin and Al-Mu'tamid ibn Abbad against the army of Alfonso VI of Castile. As the battle intensified, Alfonso’s troops found themselves caught between the combined forces of Al-Mu'tamid and Yusuf ibn Tashfin. The turning point occurred when Ibn Tashfin ordered 4,000 black cavalry from Takrur to charge into the fray. Armed with massive lamta shields and javelins, their charge destroyed the Christian cavalry. During the assault, one of the black soldiers managed to wound Alfonso VI severely in the thigh, an injury that left him with a permanent limp.

As the sun began to set and realizing defeat was imminent, Alfonso retreated with a small contingent to a nearby hill and later escaped under the cover of darkness, eventually fleeing to Coria.

The battle, fought in a single day, was a monumental event. Historian Muhammad ibn al-Samak al-Amili likened it to past Islamic victories, stating: "It was a day unmatched since Yarmouk and Qadisiyyah, a triumph that solidified the foundations of religion after they had been slipping, and restored the light of truth to its brilliance." Among Muslims, the engagement was named the Battle of Al-Zallaqah, after the plain where it took place. In European accounts, the first phase of the battle, involving Alfonso VI’s confrontation with Al-Mu'tamid and Dawud ibn Aisha, became known as the Battle of Rueda, while the second phase, in which Alfonso faced Yusuf ibn Tashfin, was referred to as the Battle of Sacralias.

The news of the Muslim victory spread quickly across the region. Yusuf ibn Tashfin ordered an official proclamation of the victory to be written and distributed throughout North Africa, where it was read in mosques and Almoravid-controlled cities. Al-Mu'tamid also informed his son, Al-Rashid, in Seville of their triumph. The victory was widely celebrated across Al-Andalus.

== Consequences ==
The Battle of Sagrajas, known to Muslims as the Battle of Al-Zallaqah, was a decisive victory for the Muslim forces and a devastating defeat for the Christian armies of Iberia. Historian Ibn al-Kardabūs remarked, “The stranglehold on the peninsula was eased, and many lands were secured.” Alfonso VI, who had arrived with an army of 60,000, retreated to a mountain fortress with only around 300 knights.

The immediate outcome of the battle was the preservation of Al-Andalus from Alfonso VI's Reconquista efforts and the lifting of sieges on major Andalusian cities. Spanish historians emphasize the catastrophic nature of Alfonso's defeat, noting that he escaped in a pitiful state with only a few companions. Despite the severe losses, Alfonso's resolve remained, and he continued to launch new offensives, though he would never again experience the same success.

Politically, the victory elevated Yusuf ibn Tashfin's status across Al-Andalus. He was hailed as a savior, and his name was invoked in mosques. Prior to his intervention, Andalusian rulers had been paying tribute to their Christian adversaries. After their defeat at Al-Zallaqah, the people of Al-Andalus held Ibn Tashfin in high regard, and his influence grew across both Al-Andalus and the Maghreb, solidifying his leadership in both regions.

The battle also sent a strong message to Alfonso VI and other Christian rulers in northern Iberia about the strength of the Almoravid forces. As noted by Ibn Buluggin, the ruler of Granada, “Since that battle, the Christians have been imbued with fear and trepidation.” The Battle of Al-Zallaqah not only halted Christian expansion but also solidified Yusuf ibn Tashfin’s status as the undisputed leader of the region.

== Aftermath ==
After the conclusion of the Battle of Al-Zallaqah, Yusuf ibn Tashfin and his forces remained near Seville for three days before returning to Morocco. His return was prompted by the death of his son and heir, Abu Bakr, who had been governing the Maghreb. Concerned about potential instability, particularly due to the influence of powerful leaders like Ibrahim ibn Abu Bakr ibn Umar, governor of Sijilmasa, and the growing threat of the Banu Munad Emirate, Ibn Tashfin acted swiftly. The Banu Munad had attempted to ally with the Banu Hilal tribes to seize control of the Central Maghreb during Ibn Tashfin’s preoccupation with Al-Andalus.

To secure Al-Andalus and ensure its future stability, Ibn Tashfin took several measures. His first priority was to encourage unity among the Andalusian rulers, urging them to set aside internal disputes that had previously made them vulnerable. Ibn Buluggin recorded that "after the campaign ended, he gathered us, the rulers of Al-Andalus, and ordered us to unite and form a single front, reminding us that the Christians only preyed on us because of our division and mutual reliance on them." The Andalusian rulers accepted his call for unity.

To further strengthen the region, Ibn Tashfin left behind a force of 3,000 Almoravid soldiers under the command of Abu Abdullah ibn al-Hajj to support Al-Mu'tamid ibn Abbad, the ruler of Seville. This force was intended to maintain morale and security in the wake of the victory. Additionally, Ibn Tashfin appointed his trusted commander, Sir ibn Abi Bakr, to lead Almoravid forces in Al-Andalus. Sir ibn Abi Bakr, along with Al-Mutawakkil ibn al-Aftas, the ruler of Badajoz, advanced into central Portugal, reaching the vicinity of the Tagus River.

Meanwhile, Al-Mu'tamid ibn Abbad, with the support of Almoravid forces, marched towards Toledo and captured several fortresses, including the fortress of Aqlis. However, Al-Mu'tamid's incursion into Murcia overextended his forces, and he was forced to retreat in the face of resistance from the knights of El Cid. Simultaneously, Alfonso VI continued to pose a threat to Muslim-held cities, using the fortress of Liyt as a base for raids. After securing these measures, Yusuf ibn Tashfin returned to Morocco, crossing the strait once again to address matters in the Maghreb.

=== Siege of Aledo ===
After the Battle of Al-Zallaqah, the rulers of Al-Andalus, feeling secure in their victory over Castile, reverted to their previous divisions and internal conflicts. They neglected their responsibilities toward their subjects, focusing on leisure and indulgence. Taking advantage of this, the Castilians resumed raids on Andalusian territories and retreated to the fortress of Aledo as retaliation for their defeat at Al-Zallaqah. Alfonso VI, reassured by Yusuf ibn Tashfin's return to Morocco, sought support from Christian kingdoms and European principalities to rebuild his forces. He received reinforcements from Pisa and Genoa, with around 400 ships, which he used to besiege Valencia and attack the Andalusian coasts, particularly targeting Al-Mu'tamid ibn Abbad of Seville.

The fortress of Aledo became a crucial base for Castilian operations during this period. It housed approximately 13,000 soldiers, both cavalry and infantry, who launched raids on Saragossa, Valencia, Dénia, Xàtiva, and Murcia, capturing key fortresses. As a result, Andalusian emirates sent delegations to Marrakesh, appealing for Yusuf ibn Tashfin's help to repel Castilian aggression, particularly from Aledo.

Realizing that Seville was a primary target of these raids, Al-Mu'tamid ibn Abbad personally traveled to Marrakesh to request assistance. Upon hearing of the worsening situation in Al-Andalus, Yusuf ibn Tashfin agreed to intervene. He began assembling troops and siege equipment and crossed the sea back into Al-Andalus in 1088 (481 AH). Establishing a base in Algeciras, Ibn Tashfin prepared for a campaign and called on the Taifa kings to join him in jihad. Reinforcements from Seville, led by Al-Mu'tamid, joined the Almoravid forces to besiege Aledo.

Alfonso VI, aware of the siege, kept a close watch on the developments. The Muslim forces attacked the fortress using catapults and siege engines, attempting to cut off its supplies and reinforcements. Despite continuous assaults, the fortress of Aledo remained resilient. After four months of siege, internal disputes among the Taifa rulers and a lack of supplies forced the Almoravid forces to withdraw towards Lorca.

Upon learning of the Almoravid retreat, Alfonso VI stealthily approached Aledo, evacuated its garrison, and set the fortress on fire before retreating to Toledo. This allowed Al-Mu'tamid to take control of the now-abandoned fortress, ending the raids from Aledo. Following this, Yusuf ibn Tashfin returned to Morocco, leaving behind a force of 4,000 Almoravid soldiers to support the defense of Valencia.

=== Elimination of the Taifa kings ===
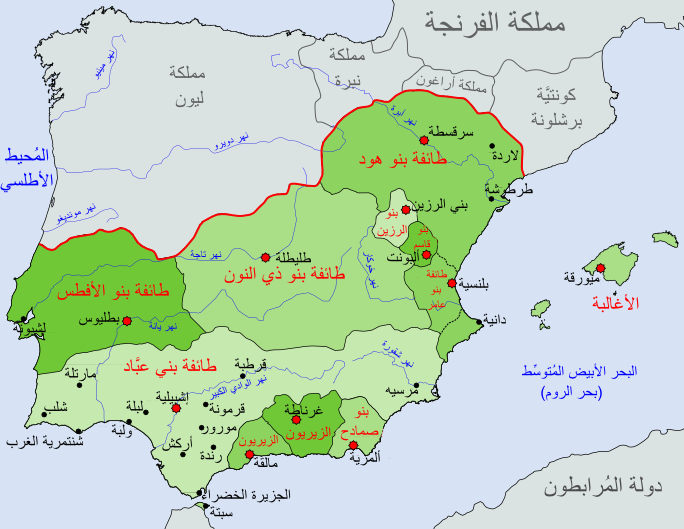
The division of the Taifa kings' states before the Almoravids entered Andalusia.

After concluding the siege of Aledo, Yusuf ibn Tashfin convened a meeting with the Taifa rulers, urging them to unify against their common enemy. He stated, "Reform your intentions, and you will suffice against your enemy." Despite his entreaties, the Taifa leaders reverted to their previous divisions and hostilities, allowing Alfonso VI to resume his raids and send envoys demanding tribute from the princes. Consequently, the situation in Al-Andalus deteriorated to its pre-Battle of Al-Zallaqah state.

In light of reports detailing the disunity and subjugation among the Taifa rulers, Ibn Tashfin resolved to return to Al-Andalus for a third time. He made preparations for his army in Ceuta and crossed the sea once again in 1090 (483 AH), accompanied by some of the most renowned leaders of the Almoravid forces.

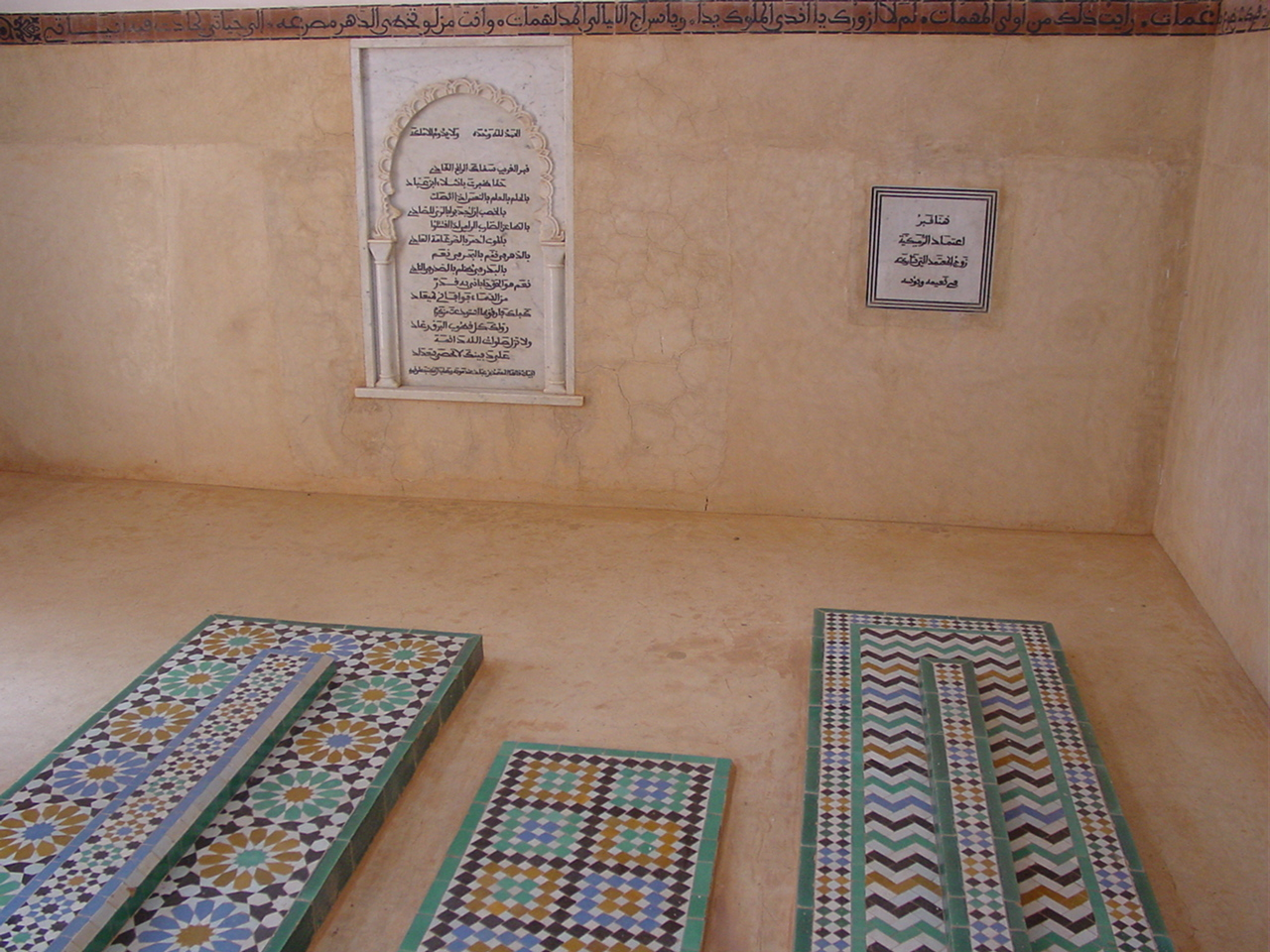
The tomb of al-Maqdad and his wife Rumaykia.

Upon reaching Toledo, Ibn Tashfin laid siege to the city while Alfonso VI was still present. He then advanced northward, attacking various cities in northern Castile, including the Castle of Rábade. His forces compelled the Castilians to retreat from their fortifications, which they had previously used to raid Muslim territories. However, unlike in previous campaigns, the Taifa rulers did not join Ibn Tashfin's forces nor did they provide necessary supplies. This lack of support forced Ibn Tashfin to lift the siege of Toledo due to insufficient provisions, leading to growing resentment toward the Taifa rulers, particularly the emir of Granada.

A number of scholars and jurists issued a fatwa directed at Yusuf ibn Tashfin regarding the status of the Taifa leaders, stating: “It is not permissible to obey them, nor is their rule valid, as they are corrupt. Therefore, remove them from authority.” Ibn Tashfin was particularly wary of the Emir of Granada, Abdallah ibn Buluggin. The Almoravids subsequently launched a campaign against Granada, successfully capturing the city after a two-month siege, during which Ibn Bulqīn was taken prisoner and sent to Aghmat.

Following Granada’s fall, Al-Mu'tamid sent a message to Ibn Tashfin seeking clarification on the situation, but he received no response. Ibn Tashfin then apprehended Tamim ibn Bulqīn, the Emir of Málaga, before returning to Morocco. To eliminate the Taifa kings, he dispatched four armies to Al-Andalus simultaneously: Sir ibn Abi Bakr was sent to Seville, Abu Abdullah Muhammad ibn al-Hajj to Córdoba, Surur al-Lamtūnī to Ronda, and Abu Zakariya ibn Wansū to Almería. Meanwhile, Ibn Tashfin remained in Ceuta at the head of a reserve army.

The four Almoravid armies succeeded in capturing Córdoba and advanced to the outskirts of Toledo, seizing both the Castle of Rábade and Carmona. In response, Ibn al-Abbad sought assistance from Alfonso VI, who sent reinforcements led by Count Gómez, comprising 40,000 infantry and 20,000 cavalry. ultimately resulting in the forced opening of Seville in 484 AH (1091 CE). Following the battle, Ibn al-Abbad was captured and sent as a prisoner to Aghmat.

Within eighteen months, the Almoravids managed to conquer all the major cities of Al-Andalus, including Granada, Málaga, Jaén, Córdoba, Seville, Almería, Valencia, Badajoz, and the Balearic Islands. This marked the end of the era of the Taifa kings and the establishment of Almoravid control over Al-Andalus.

== Bibliography ==
- Heath, I. (1989). Armies of Feudal Europe 1066–1300 (2nd ed.). Wargames Research Group.
- Kennedy, H. (1996). Muslim Spain and Portugal: A political history of al-Andalus. London: Longman.
- Lewis, David Levering, God's Crucible: Islam and the Making of Europe, 570 to 1215 (New York: W & W Norton Inc, 2008), ISBN 0-393-06472-7.
- Livermore, H. V. (1966) A New History of Portugal. Cambridge University Press.
- Nicolle, D. (1988) El Cid and the Reconquista 1050–1492 (Men-at-Arms 200). Osprey.
- Smith, C. (1989–92) Christians and Moors in Spain, Aris & Phillips
- Dupuy, R. Ernest, and Trevor N. Dupuy, The Harper Encyclopedia of Military History, HarperCollins Publishers, 1993.
- France, John, Western Warfare in the Age of the Crusades, 1000–1300 (Ithaca: Cornell University Press, 1999), ISBN 0-8014-8607-6
