= Samuel ibn Naghrillah =

Jewish vizier, commander, scholar, and poet in Muslim Spain (993–c. 1055)

Samuel Ibn Naghrillah
- שמואל הנגיד
- Pronunciation: Šəmūʿel HanNāgid
- Born: 993; Córdoba, Al-Andalus (modern-day Spain)
- Died: c. 1056 (63 years); Granada, Taifa of Granada (modern-day Spain)
- Other name: Abu Ibrahim Ismail b. Yusuf Ibn Ghazzal
- Occupations: Grand vizier, secretary of state, military commander
- Years active: 1038–1056
- Era: Golden age of Jewish culture in Spain
- Known for: Hebrew poetry; Political and military leadership
- Children: Joseph ibn Naghrillah; Elyasaf ibn Naghrillah; A daughter (name unknown)

Shemuel ibn Naghrillah (Hebrew: שְׁמוּאֵל הַלֵּוִי בֶּן יוֹסֵף, romanized: Šəmuʿēl HalLēvi ben Yosēf; Arabic: أبو إسحاق إسماعيل بن النغريلة, romanized: ʾAbū ʾIsḥāq ʾIsmāʿīl bin an-Naġrīlah), mainly known as Shemuel HaNagid (Hebrew: שמואל הנגיד, romanized: Šəmūʿel HanNāgid, lit. 'Samuel the Prince') and Isma'il ibn Naghrilla (993–1056), was a Jewish statesman, military commander, scholar, linguist and poet in medieval al-Andalus. He served as grand vizier of the Taifa of Granada, commander of its army in battle, and leader of the local Jewish community. Rising to unprecedented prominence in both Muslim and Jewish spheres, he became one of the most powerful and influential Jews in medieval Spain. He is also considered one of the greatest Jewish poets of all time.

Raised in Córdoba in a Jewish merchant family, Samuel received a broad education in Jewish law, astronomy, logic, and biblical exegesis. Following unrest in Córdoba, he settled in Granada, where he entered government service and quickly rose in rank. He led Granada's forces in battles against Seville, Carmona, and Christian mercenaries. He was a respected halakhic authority, talmudist, and philanthropist, supporting Jewish academies in Babylonia and North Africa and leading a Jewish academy in Granada. His relationships extended to towering Jewish intellectuals such as Solomon Ibn Gabirol and Nissim Gaon of Kairouan. He was involved in the Hebrew grammar debates of his time, opposing Jonah Ibn Janah, and contributed to the development of medieval Hebrew philology.

Ibn Naghrillah was a prolific and versatile poet whose Hebrew verse, considered among the finest of the Golden Age of Jewish culture in Spain, encompassed war poetry, personal laments, satire, love poetry, philosophical reflection, and didactic composition. His three principal poetic collections, Ben Tehillim (secular and battle poetry), Ben Mishlei (rhymed proverbs), and Ben Qohelet (philosophical and didactic verse), reflected biblical models and adapted Arabic meters into Hebrew. Upon his death in 1056, his son Joseph assumed his roles as vizier and leader of Granada's Jewish community; however, his lack of political finesse and growing unpopularity contributed to rising tensions that culminated in the 1066 massacre of the city's Jews and his own assassination.

== Life ==
Samuel was a Jew of al-Andalus born in Mérida to a wealthy family in 993. He studied Jewish law and became a Talmudic scholar who was fluent in Hebrew, Arabic, Latin, and one of the Berber languages.

Samuel was the student of Hanoch ben Moses, son of a prominent Mesopotamian Jew from Sura who had become head of the rabbinical community of the Caliphate of Córdoba. He was only twenty years old when the caliphate fell during the Fitna of al-Andalus, a disastrous civil war.

Samuel may have left Córdoba in 1013 during the Berber uprising or after 1016 when Ali ibn Hammud took the city. He settled in the port of Málaga and became either a spice merchant or grocer while devoting his leisure to Talmudic and literary studies. In 1027, at age 34, Samuel was named Nagid, or leader, of the Jewish community, the first person in al-Andalus to hold that title. His political ascent continued, and in 1037, under King Badis ibn Habus, he was promoted to Chief Vizier of Granada and commander of its Muslim army. Samuel served either as battlefield commander or in a strategic capacity for the next eighteen years, leading Granada to military success and stability. His leadership helped transform Granada into one of the most prosperous and powerful of the Taifa kingdoms.

Around 1020, he settled in Granada, where he entered the service of the royal court after the secretary of the prime minister fell ill, and soon assumed that position himself. He was eventually appointed vizier and later commander-in-chief of the Granadan army, serving in both roles until his death in 1056.

His relations with the Granadan royal court and his eventual promotion to the position of vizier happened coincidentally. Twentieth-century scholar Jacob Rader Marcus gives an account pulled from a 12th-century book Sefer ha-Qabbalah. The shop Rabbi Shemuel set up was near the palace of the vizier of Granada, Abu al-Kasim ibn al-Arif. The vizier met Rabbi Samuel when his maidservant began to ask Rabbi Shemuel to write letters for her. Eventually, Rabbi Samuel was given the job of tax collector, then secretary, and finally assistant vizier of state to the Granadan king Habbus al-Muzaffar.

When Habbus died in 1038, Rabbi Shemuel made certain that King Habbus’ second son Badis ibn Habus succeeded him, not his firstborn son Bulukkin. The reason behind this act was that Badis was more favored by the people, compared to Bulukkin, with the general Jewish population under Rabbi Shemuel supporting Badis. In return for his support, Badis made Shemuel ha-Nagid his vizier and top general. Some sources say that he held office as a viziership of state for over three decades until his death sometime around or after 1055. Other leading Jews, including Joseph ibn Migash, in the generation that succeeded Samuel, lent their support to Bulukkin and were forced to flee for their safety.

Jews and other non-Muslims were ordinarily not permitted to hold public office in Islamic nations, as per an agreement made in the Pact of Umar. For Shemuel ha-Nagid, a dhimmi, to attain such a high public office was therefore very rare. This is cited as an example of the Golden age of Jewish culture in Spain. That a Jew would command the Muslim army, which he did for 17 years, having them under his authority, was an astonishing feat.

Samuel HaNagid was notable for his sustained support of the poor, aiding scholars and poets in particular. His role as a benefactor of learning and literature has led historians to characterize him as a major cultural patron in medieval al-Andalus. Historian Hayim Hillel Ben-Sasson compared him to Gaius Maecenas, the influential Roman advisor and patron of the arts under Augustus. Among those who received his patronage was the renowned poet and philosopher Solomon Ibn Gabirol, though their relationship was known to be tense.

He founded the yeshiva that produced such brilliant scholars as Yitzhaq ibn Ghiath and Maimon ben Joseph, the father of Maimonides.

Twelfth-century historian Abraham ibn Daud wrote that Samuel ibn Naghrillah had earned "Four crowns: the crown of Torah, the crown of power, the crown of a Levite ... and the crown of a good name."

One story that encapsulates Shemuel ha-Nagid’s political prowess takes place soon after the succession of Badis. The faction of Yaddair ben Hubasa, Habbus' favorite nephew, told Samuel Nagid that they wanted to overthrow the new king and wanted his support. Rabbi Shemuel faked support and allowed them to meet in his house. He told Badis and was allowed to spy on the meeting. Badis wanted to execute the plotters, but Shemuel ha-Nagid convinced him that it would be politically better not to. Ultimately, he was even further respected by the king and in good standing with the rebels.

As a Jew, Shemuel ha-Nagid actively sought to assert independence from the geonim of the Talmudic academies in Babylonia by writing independently on halakha (Jewish law) for the Iberian Jewish community. Shemuel ha-Nagid became the leader of Spanish Jewry around the late 1020s. He promoted the welfare of the Jewish people through various acts. For example, he promoted Jewish learning by purchasing many copies of the Talmud, the massive compendium of commentaries on the Jewish oral law. He also promoted the study of the Talmud by giving a form of scholarship to those who wanted to study the Torah for a living.

Samuel died in 1056 of natural causes, reportedly from exhaustion following a military campaign.

== Family ==
Samuel Ibn Naghrillah had at least three children: two sons, Joseph (alternatively Yehosef, Yusuf) and Elyasaf, and a daughter. His eldest son, Joseph ibn Naghrillah (1035–1066), was appointed collector of his father’s poetry at the age of eight and a half, editing the poems and adding Arabic headings to them. During Samuel's military campaigns, he sent poems to Joseph from the field. In 1049, while Samuel was away at war, his wife gave birth to their second son, Elyasaf, who, under Samuel's supervision, began editing his father's rhymed proverbs at the age of six. That same year, Samuel arranged for Joseph to marry the daughter of Nissim ben Jacob, the gaon of the Kairouan Yeshiva and one of the most respected Torah scholars of the time.

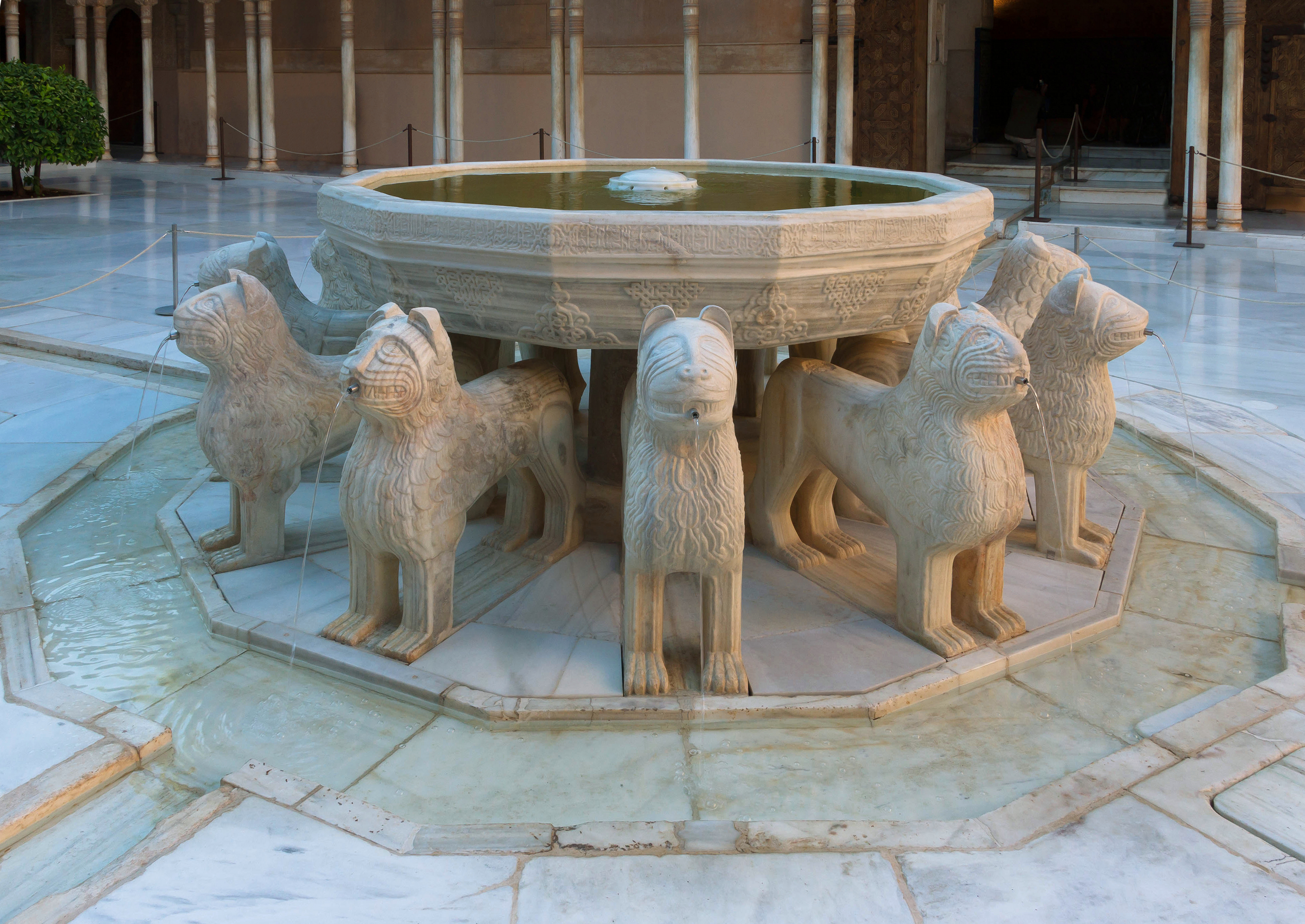
The Fountain of the Lions in Granada's Alhambra has been linked to Joseph ibn Naghrillah

After Samuel's death in 1056, Joseph, still under twenty-one, succeeded him as vizier of Granada and leader of its Jewish community. Unlike his father, he lacked political tact and reportedly used tax revenues to build a personal palace, the original Alhambra, begun in his father's lifetime. Many Muslims, envious of his position, accused him of using his office to benefit Jewish friends. On December 30, 1066, Joseph was assassinated during a mob uprising. His body was crucified on the city's main gate, and the following morning, the violence escalated into a massacre in which most of Granada's Jewish population was killed. The Jewish community of Granada was later reestablished; however, it was destroyed again in 1090 by the arriving Almoravid dynasty, who were puritans intolerant of non-Muslims.

Samuel also had a daughter, though her name is not preserved. It has often been speculated that Samuel was the father or otherwise an ancestor of Qasmuna, the only attested medieval female Jewish poet writing in Arabic, but the foundations for these claims are shaky. According to historian Norman Roth, the speculation that his daughter was the author of Arabic verse found in a later collection "is absurd because she died long before those verses were written."

== Poetry ==
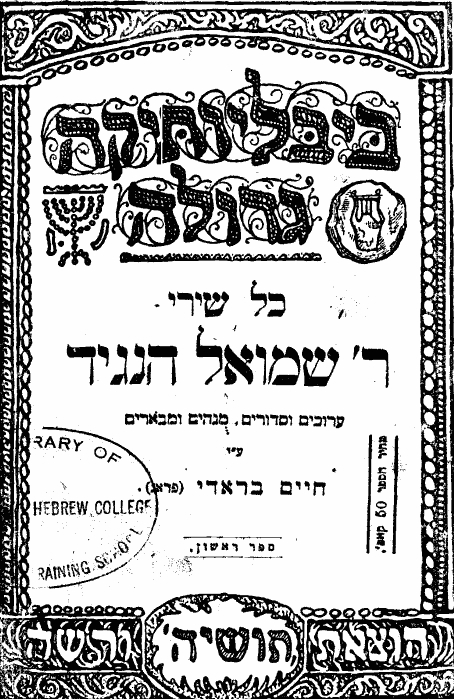
A 1910 edition of Samuel HaNagid's poetry, edited by Henrik Bródy

Samuel HaNagid was one of the most prolific and innovative Hebrew poets of medieval Spain. His literary output was collected in three major works: Ben Tehillim (Son of Psalms), which includes secular and war poetry; Ben Mishlei (Son of Proverbs), a collection of rhymed proverbs; and Ben Qohelet (Son of Ecclesiastes), consisting of didactic and philosophical verse. These titles deliberately evoke biblical books traditionally attributed to King David, a figure with whom Samuel explicitly compared himself.

Thematically, his poetry covered a wide range: war, friendship, wine, love (addressed to both women and boys), science, satire, and reflections on aging and mortality. He also wrote poetry in the battlefield. When he defeated the allied armies of Seville, Malaga, and the Berbers on Sept. 8, 1047, at Ronda, he wrote in his Hebrew poem of gratitude for his deliverance: "A redemption which was like the mother of my other redemptions and they became to it as daughters."

Abba Eban wrote that Samuel HaNagid's influence in poetry, was in that he established a new style of Hebrew poetry by applying aspects of Arabic poetry to biblical Hebrew. This unique application made Hebrew poetry access the major genres of Arabic poetry. According to poetry scholar and researcher Jonathan Vardi, Samuel HaNagid's poems were originally intended for musical arrangement and performance, though the original melodies have been lost over time. What may appear to be isolated or formally repetitive poems are, in his view, parts of broader musical forms such as song cycles and contrafacta, following the traditions of musical performance in al-Andalus.

Many of Naghrillah’s poems were also written as warnings or as an interpretation of religious rules. His poem "The Reward" shows his belief that one should set time for God and time for himself. His poem The Prison talks about how the world is a cage for all of man. He claims that one should live their life unrestrained. His poem The Two Cries talks about the beginning and end of life. He talks about how people are born crying, and when people die, others cry for them. His poem Leave The Hidden Things talks about leaving the mysteries of the world for God to know.

=== War poetry ===
Samuel ha-Nagid's war poetry frequently conveys firsthand impressions from the battlefield, including descriptions of combat:

וְהַסּוּסִים יָרוּצוּן גַּם יָשׁוּבוּן / כַּצְּפָעוֹנִים נְטוּשִׁים מִמְאוּרָה
כְּאִילוּ הָרַמָּחִים הַשְּׁלוּחִים / בְּרָקִים מִלְּאוּ אֲוִיר בְּאוֹרָה
וְהַחִצִּים כְּמוֹ נִטְפֵי גְּשָׁמִים / וְהַגַּבּוֹת כְּאִילוּ הֵם כְּבָרָה

Translation:

Horses speed back and forth like adders from their lair.
The spears flash like lightning through the air.
The arrows are drops of rain, and the swords gleam brightly.

=== Wine poetry ===
Among his well-known poems is the following wine poem:

מֵת אָב וּמֵת אֵלוּל, וּמֵת חֻמָם / גַם נֶאֱסַף תִשְרֵי וּמֵת עִמָם,
בָאוּ יְמֵי הַקֹּר, וְהַתִירוֹשׁ / אָדַם וְקוֹלוֹ בַכְלִי דָמַם.

לָכֵן, יְדִידִי, סֹב אֱלֵי רֵעִים, / כָל אִישׁ וְאִישׁ יַעַשׂ אֲשֶר זָמַם!
אָמְרוּ: חֲזֵה עָבִים בְהַגְשִימָם / וּשְמַע שְמֵי מָרוֹם בְהַרְעִימָם.

וּרְאֵה כְפוֹר וּלְשׁוֹן מְדוּרָה – זֶה / יֵרֵד וְזֶה יַעַל וְיִתְרוֹמָם.
קוּמָה, שְתֵה בַכּוֹס וְשׁוּב וּשְתֵה / בַכַד, וּבַלַיִל וְגַם יוֹמָם!

Translation:

Av is dead, and Elul is dead, and all their heat is dead, / Tishrei has passed away as well and lies dead with them. (Note: Av, Elul, and Tishrei are the summer months of the Jewish calendar, roughly corresponding to July, August, and September in the Gregorian calendar.)
The cold days are upon us, and the new wine / has grown red, its voice silent now in its barrel.

Therefore, my friend, seek company, / and let each man do whatever pleases him.
They said: "Behold the raining clouds / and listen to the thundering skies above,

And see the frost and the tongue of the flame in the hearth: one / descends as the other rises upward,
Arise now, drink out of the cup and drink again / right out of the jug, both day and night."

=== Israel's salvation ===
Samuel HaNagid also composed a series of short poems celebrating the salvation of Israel. One notable example is the poem "Shake Off, Shake Off," a phrase that directly echoes Isaiah 52:2, with other prophecies of consolation from the latter chapters of Isaiah also strongly present in the poem. The poem is addressed to the feminized personification of the nation of Israel and is distinguished by its dense integration of biblical language and prophetic structure. Through this technique, ha-Nagid not only invokes the rhetorical authority of scripture but also portrays redemption as imminent or already fulfilled:

הִתְנַעֲרִי, הִתְנַעֲרִי, / וּבְיוֹם פְּדוּת הִתְבַּשְׂרִי!
שָׁלְמוּ יְמֵי אֶבְלֵךְ וְסָר / צִירֵךְ וְנִמְצָא לָךְ צֳרִי
קוּמִי, שְׁכוּרָה סֹעֲרָה, / וּמְשַׁכְּרַיִךְ שַׁכְּרִי
עַתָּה אֲשֶׁר 'נִרְאָה וְלֹא / עַתָּה' יְהִי קָם כַּאֲרִי
צִיּוֹן אֲשֶׁר הָיְתָה לְעֵץ / יָבֵשׁ תְּהִי עוֹשָׂה פְרִי
בּשׁוּ מְבִישַׁיִךְ וְעוֹד / לֹא יִקְרְאוּ לָךְ עַם מְרִי

Translation:

Shake off, Shake off [the dust], and receive the day of salvation!
Your days of mourning are over, your pain is past, your balm has been
found.
Arise, o drunk and storm-tossed one, intoxicate those who intoxicate you,
Now, he who has been seen but [has] not [risen until] now, will rise up
like a lion.
Zion which became a withered tree will bear fruit,
Those who disgraced you will be disgraced, and no longer will you be
called a rebellious people.

While the salvation poems contain religious elements, they are not piyyutim (liturgical poems), as they lack typical features such as acrostics and contextual markers linking them to the structure of the synagogue liturgy. Based on contextual evidence and the testimony of HaNagid's son, these poems were not intended for synagogue use but were likely performed at court banquets, possibly during Jewish festivals such as Passover or the Shabbatot of Consolation following the Ninth of Av. They may also have been composed to celebrate political or military victories, or in anticipation of future messianic fulfillment. As with the example above, these works depict Israel's redemption as an accomplished fact, departing from the prevailing tone of longing in contemporaneous Hebrew poetry. Their rich prophetic diction, combined with imagery drawn from Arabic love poetry, lends them a distinctive and elevated tone of prophetic tone.

== Halakhaic works ==
Ibn Naghrillah's writings were not limited to poetry. He authored a halakhic work titled Hilkhata Gabrata, fragments of which survive, and is mistakenly credited with Mevo ha-Talmud (Introduction to the Talmud). He is also believed to have written a now-lost Talmud commentary and possibly a biblical commentary cited by later figures such as Abraham Ibn Ezra (12th century) and David Kimhi (1160–1235).

== Legacy ==
Today, Samuel HaNagid is considered one of the greatest Jewish poets of all time. The first line of Samuel HaNagid's poem "Av is dead, and Elul is dead" was incorporated into the Israeli poet Natan Yonatan's poem "Ne'esaf Tishrei", whose title also echoes it. The poem was set to music by Israeli pop artist Svika Pick, whose performance of it was voted "Song of the Year" for 1977–1978. In a 2022 readers' poll conducted by Maariv, it was selected Pick's most popular song.

Kfar HaNagid, a moshav in modern Israel, was named after him.

== Editions and translations ==
- ha-Nagid, Shemuʼel (1934). Sassoon, David Solomon (ed.). Diṿan Shemuʼel ha-Nagid / yotsʼe la-or be-faʻam rishonah be-shelemuto ʻal pi ketav yad yaḥid ba-ʻolam (k.y. S. Śaśon 589) ʻim haḳadamah u-mafteaḥ shirim ʻa.y. David ben l.a.a. Solimon ben David Śaśon דיואן שמואל הנגיד / יוצא לאור בפעם ראשונה בשלמותו על פי כתב יד יחיד בעולם (כי ששון ס' תקפט) עם הקדמה ומפתח שירים עי דוד בן לאא דלימאן דוד ששון. [Diwan of Shemuel Hannaghid] (in Hebrew). Oxford: Oxford University Press.
- ha-Nagid, Shemuʼel (1966–82). Jarden, Dov (ed.). Diṿan Shemuʼel ha-Nagid; Ben Tehilim, mutḳan ʻal pi kitve yad u-defusim rishonim ʻim mavo, perush, meḳorot, shinuye nosaḥ, reshimot, mafteḥot / milon u-bibliyografyah ʻal yede Dov Yarden דיואן שמואל הנגיד : בן תהלים מתקן על פי כתבי יד ודפוסים ראשונים עם מבוא, פרוש, מקורות, שנויי נסח, רשימות, מפתחות, מלון ובבליוגרפיה / על ידי דב ירדן [Divan Shmuel Hanagid] (in Hebrew). Vol. 3. Jerusalem: הברו יוניון קולג' פרס.
- HaNagid, Shmuel (2016). Cole, Peter (ed.). Selected Poems of Shmuel HaNagid. Princeton University Press. ISBN 978-1-4008-8409-4.

== See also ==
- Golden Age of Jewish culture in Spain
- Hasdai ibn Shaprut
- Judah Halevi
- Solomon ibn Gabirol

== Bibliography ==
- Ben-Sasson, H. H. (1976). "The Era of the Mishnah and Talmud (70–640)". A History of the Jewish People. Harvard University Press. pp. 385–723. ISBN 0-674-39731-2.
- Cole, Peter (2016). Selected Poems of Shmuel HaNagid. The Lockert Library of Poetry in Translation. Princeton University Press. ISBN 9781400884094.
- Fatimer, Dudi (2022). "השיר שהוליד מחדש את צביקה פיק: זהו השיר שאתם בחרתם כגדול מכולם" [The Song That Reignited Svika Pick's Career: This Is the One You Voted as His Greatest]. Maariv Online (in Hebrew).
- Roth, Norman, ed. (2003). "Ibn Naghrillah, Samuel (993-1056)". Medieval Jewish Civilization: An Encyclopedia. Routledge Revivals. Routledge. pp. 363–366. ISBN 9781315165394.
- Shahaf, Keren (2016). "מת אב ומת אלול - ונולד פרק חדש ומוצלח בקריירה של צביקה פיק" [Av is dead, and Elul is dead - and a new and successful chapter in Svika Pick's career was born]. ynet (in Hebrew).
- Vardi, Jonathan (2019). "Poems of Salvation by Samuel Hanagid". Hispania Judaica Bulletin (14): 1–14.
- Vardi, Jonathan (26 June 2023). "Music in the Dīwān of Samuel ha-Nagid". Medieval Encounters (Research article). 29 (4). Brill: 358–390. doi:10.1163/15700674-12340169.
