= Norman Roth =

American historian

Norman Roth is an American historian and author.

== Bibliography ==
- Jews, Visigoths and Muslims in Medieval Spain: Cooperation and Conflict (1994)
- Conversos, Inquisition, and the Expulsion of the Jews from Spain (1995)
