= Deifontes =

Coordinates: 37°19′N 3°36′W

- city
- Coat of arms

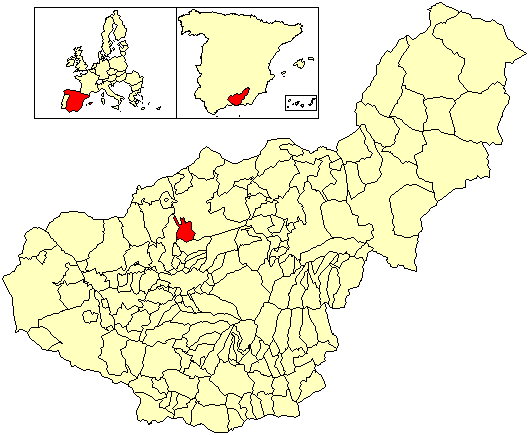
- Location of Deifontes
- Country: Spain
- Province: Granada
- Municipality: Deifontes

Area
  - Total: 40.48 km^{2} (15.63 sq mi)
- Elevation: 735 m (2,411 ft)

Population (2025-01-01)
  - Total: 2,612
  - Density: 64.53/km^{2} (167.1/sq mi)
- Time zone: UTC+1 (CET)
  - Summer (DST): UTC+2 (CEST)

Deifontes is a municipality located in the province of Granada, Spain. According to the 2006 census (INE), the city had a population of 2478 inhabitants.

== See also ==
- List of municipalities in Granada
