= Hayim Hillel Ben-Sasson =

Israeli historian (1914–1977)

Haim Hillel Ben-Sasson
- חיים הלל בן-ששון
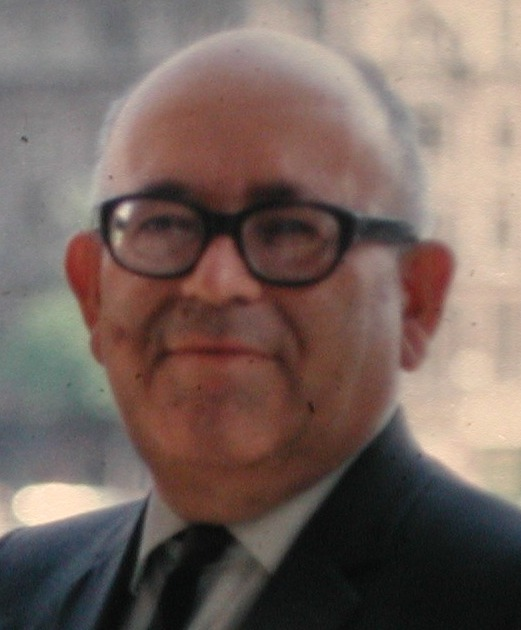
- Prof. Chaim Hillel Ben-Sasson, 1971
- Born: 17 February 1914; Valozhyn, Russian Empire
- Died: 16 May 1977 (aged 63); Jerusalem, Israel
- Education: Hebrew University of Jerusalem
- Occupations: Historian, Professor
- Employer: Hebrew University of Jerusalem
- Known for: Research on Jewish history during the Middle Ages and modern period
- Notable work: The History of the Jewish People, Continuity and Change: Studies in Jewish History in the Middle Ages and Modern Times
- Parent(s): Fraydel Darchinsky and Rabbi Shmuel Avigdor HaLevi Darchinsky
- Relatives: Prof. Yonah Ben-Sasson (brother), Menachem Ben-Sasson (nephew)

Haim Hillel Ben-Sasson (Hebrew: חיים הלל בן-ששון; 1914 in Valozhyn – 16 May 1977 in Jerusalem) was an Israeli historian and a professor in the Department of Jewish History at the Hebrew University of Jerusalem. His area of expertise was the history of Jews in the Middle Ages, along with issues concerning the history of Jews in Eretz Yisrael during the modern period.

== Biography ==
Chaim Hillel Ben-Sasson was born in Volozhin to Fraydel (whose name was Hebraized and gave rise to the surname he and his brother adopted in Israel) and Rabbi Shmuel Avigdor HaLevi Darchinsky, a Rosh Mesivta in the Volozhin Yeshiva in Lithuania. On his mother’s side, he was the grandson of Rabbi Chaim Hillel Fried, deputy head of the Volozhin Yeshiva and a descendant of its leaders. He received his Rabbinic ordination from Rabbi Chaim Ozer Grodzinski. Even in his youth, he was active in public life, organizing the HaHalutz HaMizrachi ("Mizrachi Pioneer" movement).

Ben-Sasson immigrated to Eretz Yisrael in 1934. He studied at the Mizrachi Teachers' Seminary (now the Lifshitz College of Education) and taught in various educational frameworks for children and youth in Jerusalem. He also volunteered in the youth movement Bnei Akiva and in the Yavneh Olami student union.

Upon his arrival in Eretz Yisrael, Ben-Sasson enlisted in the "Haganah" organization; during the Arab Riots of 1936, he served in the "religious platoon" in the Jewish Quarter of the Old City of Jerusalem, and later in the Haganah’s Information Office in Jerusalem. According to his student Robert Bonfil, "He remained connected to the Israel Defense Forces until his last day and contributed to study meetings at the high command level. He participated in frameworks for discussion and analysis of important contemporary issues." His involvement in modern Jewish militarism was also reflected in his contributions to the writing and editing of the History of the Haganah under the general editorship of Prof. Ben-Zion Dinur, despite his primary focus on the Middle Ages, he dedicated himself to the research and historical description of the Jewish Legion in World War I.

He died in Jerusalem on 16 May 1977.

== Academic career ==
After his studies at the seminary, he enrolled at the Hebrew University. Ben-Sasson was a student of historian Yitzhak Baer. He specialized in the history of the Jewish people during the Middle Ages and the early modern period. He earned his humanities degree in 1944.

Ben-Sasson began teaching at the university in 1949 and was appointed a full professor at the Hebrew University of Jerusalem in 1970. He was a popular teacher, and several of his students went on to pursue advanced degrees. In addition to his numerous and varied research works, Ben-Sasson was an editor of the journal Zion and the historical section of the Encyclopaedia Judaica.

Ben-Sasson viewed historical research, historiography, and the interest in history as essential spiritual work for strengthening one’s character and improving society. He expressed these views in his writings:

"In truth, it is fitting for the modern individual to dedicate their heart primarily to their historical world, for the sake of their soul and the health of society."

This characteristic statement directly appealed to his generation and readers to delve into the study of history and understand that historical writing is akin to the "book of humanity." In an era increasingly oriented towards the technologization of daily life, where the isolated individual, lacking the burden of generations and culture, is portrayed by thinkers and mass communication, Ben-Sasson's call was that of a rebellious educator with great spirit. According to him, the study and writing of history are imbued with the idea that revolution is always possible; engaging with history saves people from the mere functionalism of contemporary existence; historiography identifies and illuminates periods of transition and moments of change, thus highlighting the potential for transformation.

Ben-Sasson also emphasized the importance of history due to his view of human history and national history as a phenomenon with multiple and seemingly contradictory aspects; yet, he believed, historians could reveal overarching trends. For example, Ben-Sasson viewed the phenomenon of martyrdom as a form of Kiddush Hashem, where Jews chose to die or even commit suicide rather than convert to a pagan or Christian faith, a common act among Jews in Eretz Yisrael and Europe since antiquity, as an act of strength and human courage. In the circumstances of a national liberation movement, this bravery would manifest in the gathering of armed forces, the establishment of an army, and organized combat. In other words, Ben-Sasson saw a psychological commonality and a direct principle linking the seemingly passive Jewish martyrs of the Crusades to the active, militarized Jewish soldiers of the "Jewish Legion" in his own time.

His student, Prof. Yosef Haker, wrote about his methodology: "In his research and books, Ben-Sasson consistently investigates and seeks the inner essence based on analysis and clarification of diverse primary sources. These sources include primarily literary works, philosophical treatises, and halachic writings; homilies, commentaries, and questions and answers; historical texts and polemical writings; poetry and prose; decrees and letters; ethical books and Talmudic novellae. External documents and sources provided the basis for factual description and sometimes filled gaps in the spiritual and cultural picture; however, Ben-Sasson’s main focus was on clarifying the inner creative work and testimony of the Jewish community and its character. … His guiding questions indicate his search for understanding what unifies and distinguishes the Jewish people (in all its shades and sects) from other nations."

== Family ==
His younger brother, Yonah Ben-Sasson, was a lecturer in Jewish philosophy and the director of the Department of Torah Culture in the Ministry of Education. His nephew, Menachem Ben-Sasson, is a professor of Jewish history, the President of the Hebrew University of Jerusalem, a former Rector, and a former Member of Knesset and Chairman of the Constitution, Law and Justice Committee.

== Selected works ==
=== Books by Ben-Sasson ===
- Thought and Leadership: The Social Views of Polish Jews in the Late Middle Ages, Jerusalem: Bialik Institute, 1959.
- German Jewry, [Israel]: IDF - Chief Education Officer - Education Division, 1963.
- Chapters in the History of Jews in the Middle Ages, Tel Aviv: Am Oved, 1957, 1962, 1977.
- Continuity and Change: Studies in Jewish History in the Middle Ages and Modern Times; collected and edited by Yosef Haker, Tel Aviv, Am Oved, 1984.
- The History of the Jewish Legion in World War I, Tel Aviv: Zionist Library; IDF - Military, 1956.
- (Co-editor) The History of the Jews: (Album of the History of the Jewish People), Jerusalem: The Publishing Institute in Israel, 1964.
- (Co-editor) The History of the Jewish People, 3 volumes, Tel Aviv: Dvir Publishing 1969.

=== Edited works ===
- The Book of Kavod Elohim, by Avraham Ibn Migash (Constantinople, 1485), Jerusalem: National Library, 1977.
- Dictionary of Political Terms, Tel Aviv: M. Newman, 1950.
- From the Center to the Community in Place, Jerusalem: Zalman Shazar Center, 1977.
