= Habbus al-Muzaffar =

Ruler of the Taifa of Granada (r. 1019–1038)

Habbus ibn Maksen
- Zirid king of Granada

Zirid King of Granada
- Reign: 1019-1038
- Predecessor: Zawi ibn Ziri
- Successor: Badis ibn Habus
- Born: ? Achir
- Died: 1038; Granada
Names
- Al-Muzaffar Habbus ibn Maksen ibn Menad as-Sanhaji
- Dynasty: Zirids
- Father: Maksen ibn Menad
- Religion: Islam

Habbus bin Maksen al-Muzaffar (Arabic: حبوس بن ماكسن بن زيري), of the Berber Zirid dynasty, was ruler of the Taifa of Granada from 1019 to 1038. He was the successor to his uncle Zawi ben Ziri. Under his rule, the prestige of the taifa was greatly increased, and he carried out military campaigns against neighbor states, increasing Granada's territory.

He had two sons, Badis and Buluggin, and was succeeded by Badis.

== Sources ==
- Ibn Khaldun (trans. William MacGuckin Slane), Histoire des Berbères et des dynasties musulmanes de l'Afrique septentrionale, vol. 2, Imprimerie du Gouvernement, 1854, 635 p.
- Rafael Halperin The Golden and the destruction age of Spanish Jewry.
  Preceded by Zawi ben Ziri	Zirid dynasty Taifa kings of Granada; 1019-1038	Succeeded by Badis ben Habus
