= Abdallah ibn Buluggin =

Zirid king of Granada (r. 1073–1090)

- Emir of Granada
- Reign: 30 June 1073 – 7 September 1090
- Predecessor: Badis ibn Habus
- Born: 1056; Granada
- Died: after 1090; Aghmat
Names
- ʿAbd Allāh ben Buluggīn ben Bādīs ben Ḥabūs ben Zīrī
- Dynasty: Zirids
- Father: Buluggin ibn Badis

Abdallah ibn Buluggin (Arabic: عبد الله بن بلقين), full name: ʿAbd Allāh ben Buluggīn ben Bādīs ben Ḥabūs ben Zīrī (1056–after 1090), also known as "Al-Muzaffar" (the conqueror), was the grandson of Badis ben Habus and the last Zirid ruler of the Taifa of Granada (1073–1090).

== Biography ==
When his grandfather died in 1073, the territory of the Zirids in al-Andalus was divided between Abdullah and his brother Tamim. Although he was younger than Tamim, in 1064 Abdallah had been named the successor of Badis ibn Habus, who preferred him to his own son, Maksan, (uncle of Tamim and Abdallah).

== His memoirs ==
During his exile in Aghmat, Abdullah ibn Buluggin wrote his memoirs and the history of the Zirids in Granada. It is called Al-Tibyan an al-haditha al-kaina bi-dawlat Bani Ziri fi Gharnata (An Exposition of the Downfall of the Zirid Dynasty in Granada).

== Sources ==
- Bosworth, Clifford Edmund (2004). The New Islamic Dynasties: A Chronological and Genealogical Manual. Edinburgh University Press. ISBN 9780748621378.
- Ibn Buluggīn, ʻAbd Allāh (1986). Tibi, Amin Tawfiq (ed.). The Tibyān: Memoirs of ʻAbd Allāh B. Buluggīn, Last Zīrid Amīr of Granada. Brill Archive. ISBN 9004076697.

Preceded by Badis ibn Habus	Zirid dynasty Taifa kings of Granada; 1073-1090	Succeeded by Almoravid dynasty
