= Madinat al-Zahra =

Archeological site of Moorish palace in Spain

- Medina Azahara (Spanish)
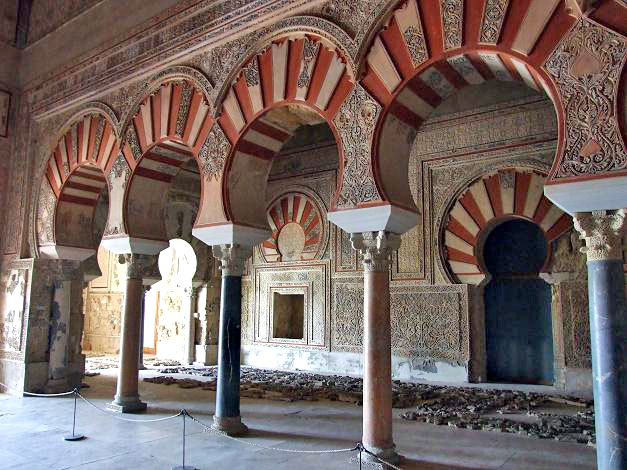
- Reception hall of Abd ar-Rahman III
- Interactive map of Madinat al-Zahra
- 37.888°N 4.867°W
- Location: Córdoba, Spain

Site notes
- Website: Madinat al-Zahra

UNESCO World Heritage Site
- Official name: Caliphate City of Medina Azahara
- Type: Cultural
- Criteria: iii, iv
- Designated: 2018 (42nd session)
- Reference no.: 1560
- Region: Europe and North America

Spanish Cultural Heritage
- Official name: Delimitación de Madinat al-Zahra
- Type: Non-movable
- Criteria: Archaeological site
- Designated: 1 July 2003
- Reference no.: RI-55-0000379

Madinat al-Zahra or Medina Azahara (Arabic: مدينة الزهراء, romanized: Madīnat az-Zahrāʾ, lit. 'the radiant city') was a fortified palace-city on the western outskirts of Córdoba in present-day Spain. Its remains are a major archaeological site today. The city was built in the 10th century by Abd ar-Rahman III (912–961), a member of the Umayyad dynasty and the first caliph of al-Andalus. It served as the capital of the Caliphate of Córdoba and its center of government.

The main reason for its construction was politico-ideological: Abd ar-Rahman III had declared himself "caliph" in 929 and the dignity of this new title required the establishment of a new city, a symbol of his power, imitating eastern caliphates. It sought to demonstrate his superiority over his great rivals, the Fatimid Caliphs of Ifriqiya in North Africa and the Abbasid Caliphs in Baghdad. The city was built near Córdoba, the existing capital of al-Andalus under Umayyad rule. Construction began in 936–940 and continued in multiple phases throughout his reign and the reign of his son, Al-Hakam II (r. 961–976). The new city included ceremonial reception halls, a congregational mosque, administrative and government offices, aristocratic residences, gardens, a mint, workshops, barracks, service quarters, and baths. Water was supplied through aqueducts. After al-Hakam II's death, however, the city ceased to act as the center of government under the rule of Ibn Abi Amir al-Mansur (Almanzor). In 978–9, al-Mansur began construction of his own palace-city, the similarly-named Madinat al-Zahira, to replace it in this role. Between 1010 and 1013, Madinat al-Zahra was sacked during a civil war and thereafter abandoned, with many of its materials re-used elsewhere.

The ruins of the city were excavated starting in 1911. Only about 10 hectares of the 112 hectares (0.43 sq mi) of the city have been excavated and partially restored, but this area includes the main palaces. A dedicated archeological museum, located on the edge of the site, was opened in 2009. On July 1, 2018, the site was listed as a UNESCO World Heritage Site with the inscription name "Caliphate City of Medina Azahara".

== Name ==
Popular legend, recorded by historical writers such as al-Maqqari, holds that the city's name, az-Zahra' (or Azahara in Spanish), came from Abd ar-Rahman III's favorite wife and that a statue of her stood over the entrance. Although statuary was present in the city, scholar Marianne Barrucand argues that the existence of this particular statue is unlikely. Scholar Felix Arnold argues that a simpler explanation is that the city's name, which also means the "Flowering City" or "Radiant City", emulated the style of other caliphal cities founded by the Abbasids (e.g. Madinat as-Salam, "City of Peace", now Baghdad) and the Fatimids (e.g. Madinat al-Qahira, "Victorious City", now Cairo). Jonathan Bloom also notes that the name may have been chosen as a riposte to Abd ar-Rahman's main rivals, the Fatimids, because the Fatimids claimed descent from Muhammad's daughter Fatimah, who was also known as az-Zahra ("the Radiant").

== History ==
=== Background ===
Abd ar-Rahman III was a member of the Umayyad dynasty, which had formerly ruled the Islamic world as head of the Umayyad Caliphate. The title "caliph" signified the political and spiritual leader of the whole Muslim world. In 750 the Umayyads were overthrown by the Abbasids, who took on the title of caliphs and established a new capital at Baghdad. In 756 Abd ar Rahman III's ancestor, Abd ar-Rahman I, managed to re-establish the dynasty's power in the Iberian Peninsula in the far western part of the Muslim world, known as Al-Andalus. Although independent from the Abbasids, the new Umayyad rulers in Al-Andalus, based in Córdoba, did not reclaim the title of "caliph" at this time. Instead, they ruled as "emirs", a lower title designating local Muslim rulers, as heads of the Emirate of Córdoba. While Arabic and Islamic culture thrived in Al-Andalus during this period, it was still a relatively decentralized realm and the emir in Córdoba often struggled to keep different factions under control.

When Abd ar-Rahman III came to power as emir in 912, he began to systematically re-establish Umayyad authority over rebel regions within his realm and reinforce his own authority across Al-Andalus through military and diplomatic means. In 929, after years of constant campaigning, Abd ar-Rahman III felt confident enough to declare himself "caliph", a title equal to the Abbasid rulers in Baghdad (whose own power had significantly weakened by this time). This move may also have been in response to the rise of the Fatimid Caliphate in North Africa around the same time, which challenged the Sunni caliphs of Baghdad and also presented a threat to the interests of the Umayyad state in Al-Andalus.

Before the creation of Madinat al-Zahra, the residence and centre of government for the Umayyad emirs had been the Alcázar in the heart of Córdoba, across from which stood the Great Mosque of Córdoba. Many scholars argue that the motives for the construction of a new palace-city must have included a desire to create a capital and residence that would reflect the dignity and grandeur which Abd ar-Rahman III wanted to project around his new caliphate. The creation of such palace-cities also had precedents because both the Abbasid caliphs and the Fatimid caliphs had previously built such cities for themselves.

=== Construction and development ===
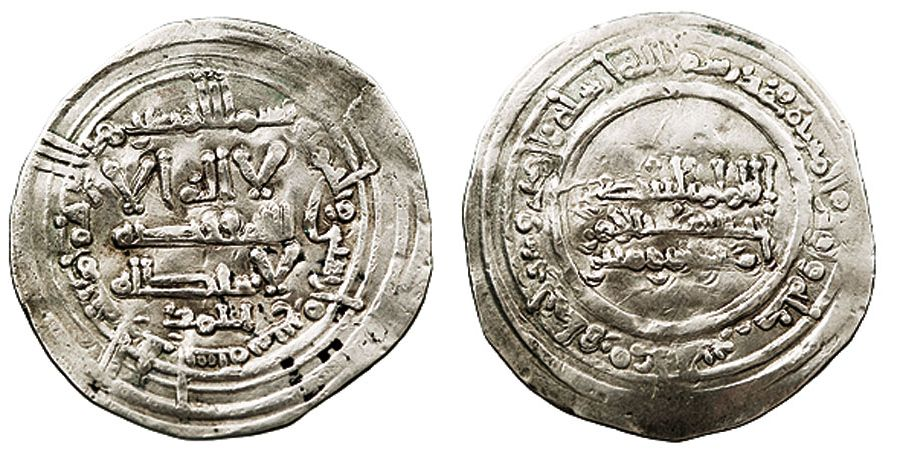
Coins minted at Madinat al-Zahra in 347 AH (958 or 959 CE), in the name of Abd ar-Rahman III

According to historical sources the new palace-city was founded in 936. It was located about 5 km west of Córdoba. Abd ar-Rahman III's son, Al-Hakam II, the crown prince and his future successor, was entrusted to oversee the construction. The 16th-century writer Al-Maqqari cites a man named Maslama ibn 'Abdallah as the architect of the city, but it is unclear how large his role was or how much of the city he actually designed. Major construction might not have actually started until 940, and evidence suggests that it occurred in stages, with the overall plan changing as further work was executed. The mosque on the site was completed in 941–942 or in 944–945. By 945, the caliph was already living in the city. The road between the new city and Córdoba was paved in 946. Finally, in 947 the apparatus of state, including the mint (dar al-sikka), was transferred here from Córdoba. Construction in the city nonetheless continued throughout the remaining years of Abd ar-Rahman III's reign (up to 961) and throughout Al-Hakam II's reign (961–976). High-ranking officials under both caliphs were often involved in the construction as well.

The whole city was surrounded by a fortified wall with towers. However, there is evidence that only the palaces were protected by a wall at first and that the outer city wall was added after residential areas had already begun to develop outside the palace. Abd ar-Rahman III also arranged for thousands of antique marble columns to be procured or imported from other sites, mostly from Ifriqiya (despite it being under Fatimid control at the time), to be reused for construction here. Al-Hakam II also reportedly procured many Roman statues and carved sarcophagi, which were used to decorate the grounds.

Several of the major structures that have been excavated and identified on the site were built over earlier structures and thus appear to belong to a different construction phase after the initial construction of the city. The structures known today as the House of Ja'far and the Court of the Pillars were both built over two or three smaller structures which occupied the same spaces. In addition to being larger than their predecessors, they also feature very different layouts, such as a semi-basilical plan (in the House of Ja'far) and a courtyard surrounded by a porticoed gallery (the Court of the Pillars). Antonio Vallejo Triano, who led archeological work at the site between 1985 and 2013, has argued that the Court of the Pillars likely dates from the 950s. Likewise, the large Upper Basilical Hall, also known as the Dar al-Jund ("House of the Army"), is believed to date from this time. The construction of the Salón Rico, or Reception Hall of Abd ar-Rahman III, has been dated to between 953 and 957 thanks to several inscriptions featured in its decoration. The supervisor of the hall's construction was Abdallah ibn Badr, the vizier and highest-ranking official under the caliph at that time. The decoration was executed under the supervision of the caliph's eunuch servant Shunaif, although it's unclear if he was also involved in the design of the hall.

Based on the evidence of these constructions, Vallejo Triano has argued that a fairly significant remodelling of the palace complex took place in the 950s. It followed a trend of larger and more monumental buildings which made use of porticos, arcades, and different basilical layouts. These new structures were often built over older, relatively more modest structures, and were thus designed to increase the impression of the caliph's magnificence through the architecture of his city. Vallejo Triano notes that this period would also coincide with a major reorganization of the state by Abd ar-Rahman III in 955, which is reported by historical sources such as Ibn Idhari. Additionally, Abd ar-Rahman III was likely becoming better-informed about the rich palaces and elaborate court ceremony in the new Fatimid capital, Mahdia, and in the Byzantine capital, Constantinople. For example, some of Abd ar-Rahman III's emissaries to the Byzantine emperor brought back with them gilded bronze sculptures, marble fountain basins decorated with animal figures, and other decorative architectural elements. This growing awareness of other imperial courts and Abd ar-Rahman's desire to match them may explain an increase in the complexity of the ceremonies and court protocols surrounding the caliph around this time, to which historical sources of the time attached great importance, along with an increase in the architectural scale of the new buildings.

Vallejo Triano has also argued that the construction of the House of Ja'far took place slightly later than the other structures of the 950s because its decoration appears to be more evolved. This tentatively supports an earlier hypothesis by Félix Hernández Giménez that this large residence was built for Ja'far, a hajib (chamberlain) of Al-Hakam II between 961 and 971, and for whom the structure is currently named. This also makes it the only major structure in Madinat al-Zahra that has been identified as belonging to the reign of Al-Hakam II.

=== Life and government within the palace-city ===
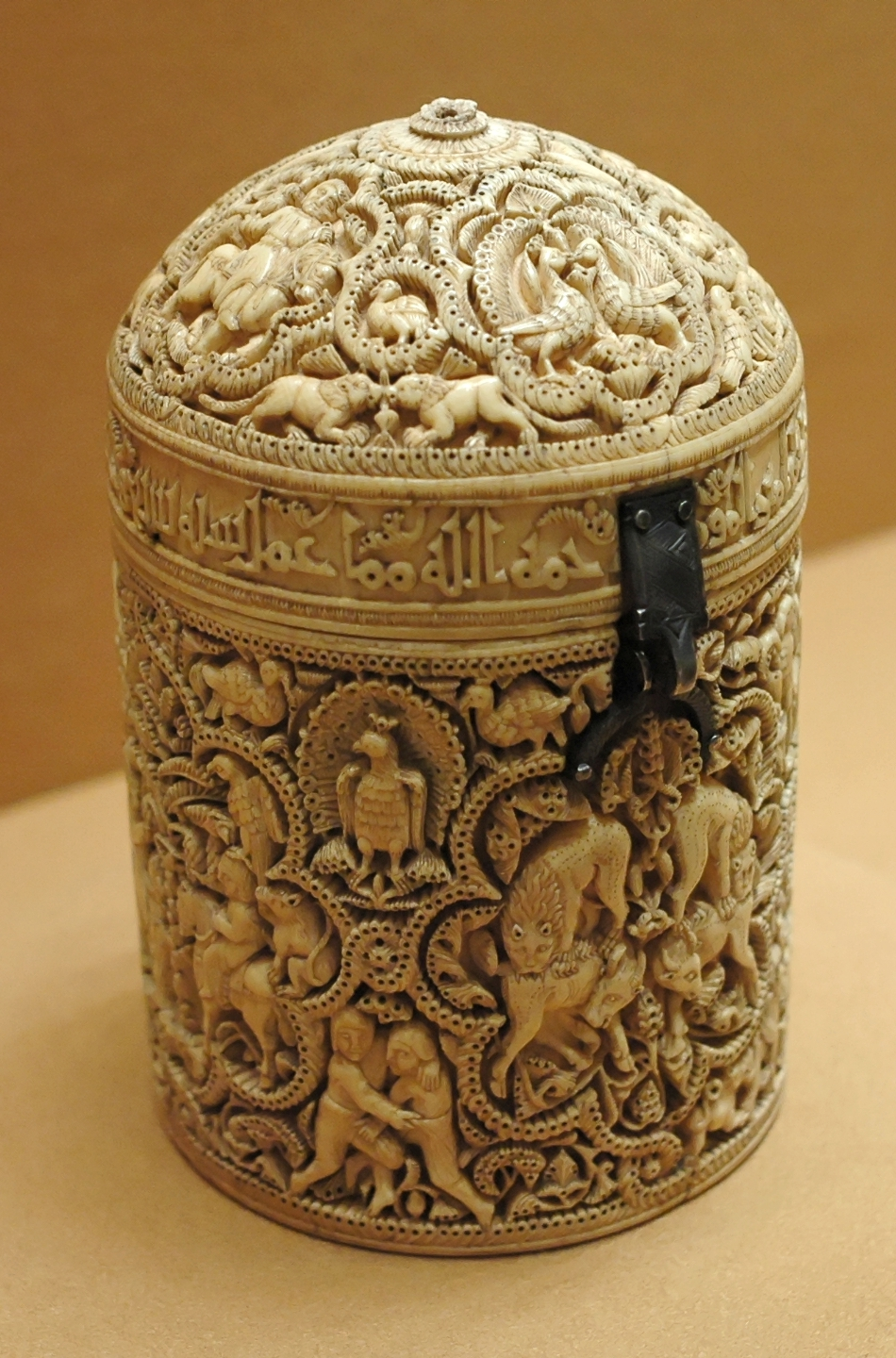
The Pyxis of al-Mughira, one of the luxury items produced in the workshops of Madinat al-Zahra, dated to 968 and now kept at the Louvre Museum

The palaces housed the caliph's household, including a large number of concubines. The residents were served by a large body of slaves, including eunuchs, of mostly European origin. The city also contained a throne hall or audience chamber (the Salón Rico), government offices, workshops that produced luxury objects, the residences of high officials, and – on the lower levels of the city – markets and residential districts for the common workers. The city had a manager, a judge, and a police chief. Under the cultured caliph Al-Hakam II in particular, there was also a library which by some accounts contained hundreds of thousands of volumes in Arabic, Greek, and Latin. The main congregational mosque and one or more small neighbourhood mosques provided religious services.

The palaces were furnished with silks, tapestries, and various luxury objects. Many objects produced in the caliph's official workshops were given as gifts and have made their way into the collections of museums and Christian cathedrals. Among the wonders reported by historical chronicles about the palaces, Al-Maqqari described a domed hall in the palace which contained a pool of liquid mercury which reflected light and could be stirred to create dazzling ripples of light, although the location of this hall has not been found by modern archeologists.

The new caliphate also developed an increasingly elaborate culture of court protocols around the figure of the caliph. Lavish festivals and receptions were hosted to impress foreign ambassadors. The organisation of the city seems to have included a specific path to be followed by foreign guests and dignitaries on their way to the caliph's audience chamber, which was fronted by gardens and pools with vistas over the rest of the city and the valley below. The caliph himself would appear seated at the back and center of his audience chamber, surrounded by courtiers and officials, with the architecture designed to focus on his position. While the caliph increasingly took on an air of aloofness during this period, the protocols did not evolve to the point of hiding him completely from view – by contrast with the Fatimid caliphs in Africa, who were kept hidden behind a veil.

Various members of the caliph's family, or other wealthy elites, also built their own villas and palaces in the countryside around Córdoba during this period of prosperity in the 10th century. This was a tradition which had existed since the early days of the Emirate and possibly derived from the Roman villa tradition. The caliph even kept some family members in such villas in order to distance them from the center of power in Madinat al-Zahra, providing them with a generous stipend so they wouldn't cause trouble.

=== Construction of Madinat az-Zahira by Almanzor ===
When Al-Hakam II died in 976 he was succeeded by his son Hisham II, who was 14 or 15 years old at the time and had little political experience. Consequently, de facto political power was assumed by Ibn Abi Amir, a strongman who appropriated for himself both the post of hajib (chamberlain) and wazir (vizier) and who adopted the regnal title "al-Mansur" (or Almanzor in European sources). In 978 or 979 (368 AH), after he had secured the monopoly of power, he ordered the construction of a new palace city for himself which rivaled Madinat al-Zahra in beauty. Al-Mansur called his palace with a very similar name: Madinat Az-Zahira ("the Shining City"). The location of the palace, which has never been excavated, is still debated: it may have been between Córdoba and Madinat az-Zahra to the west, but the most common hypothesis is that it was built a short distance east of Córdoba, near the banks of the Guadalquivir River, in order to draw the focus of power away from the earlier Umayyad palaces. The new palace took only two years to build. When it was ready Al-Mansur moved the center of government there, leaving the old Madinat al-Zahra in disuse and confining the young caliph Hisham to the old Alcázar in Córdoba instead.

=== Decline and destruction ===
On the death of Al-Mansur in 1002, his eldest son Abd al-Malik al-Muzaffar succeeded to power. When al-Muzaffar in turn died in 1008, his brother Abd ar-Rahman, also known as Sanchuelo ("Little Sancho", as his mother Abda was a daughter of Sancho, the king of Navarre) came to power. Less politically able than his father and brother, he tried to appropriate for himself the inheritance of the caliphate from Hisham, which aroused serious opposition. In an attempt to avoid these problems, he set out for a military campaign to the Christian north almost right away. When he crossed the border into Christian territory in February 1009, his opponents broke into the old Alcázar and forced Hisham II to abdicate to another member of the Umayyad family, Muhammad. At the same time, Madinat al-Zahira, the palace built by Al-Mansur and the center of government, was pillaged and destroyed.

The next few years were chaotic and resulted in multiple violent confrontations and regime changes between different factions, known as the Fitna (civil war). Between 1010 and 1013 Córdoba was besieged by Berber factions, and by the end of this period Madinat al-Zahra, the city of Abd ar-Rahman III, had been pillaged and left in ruins. For many years afterwards the city continued to be looted by people for its building materials, which nearly erased it from existence. Over time its remains were buried and its location was not identified again until the 19th century, with excavations beginning in 1911.

== Geography ==
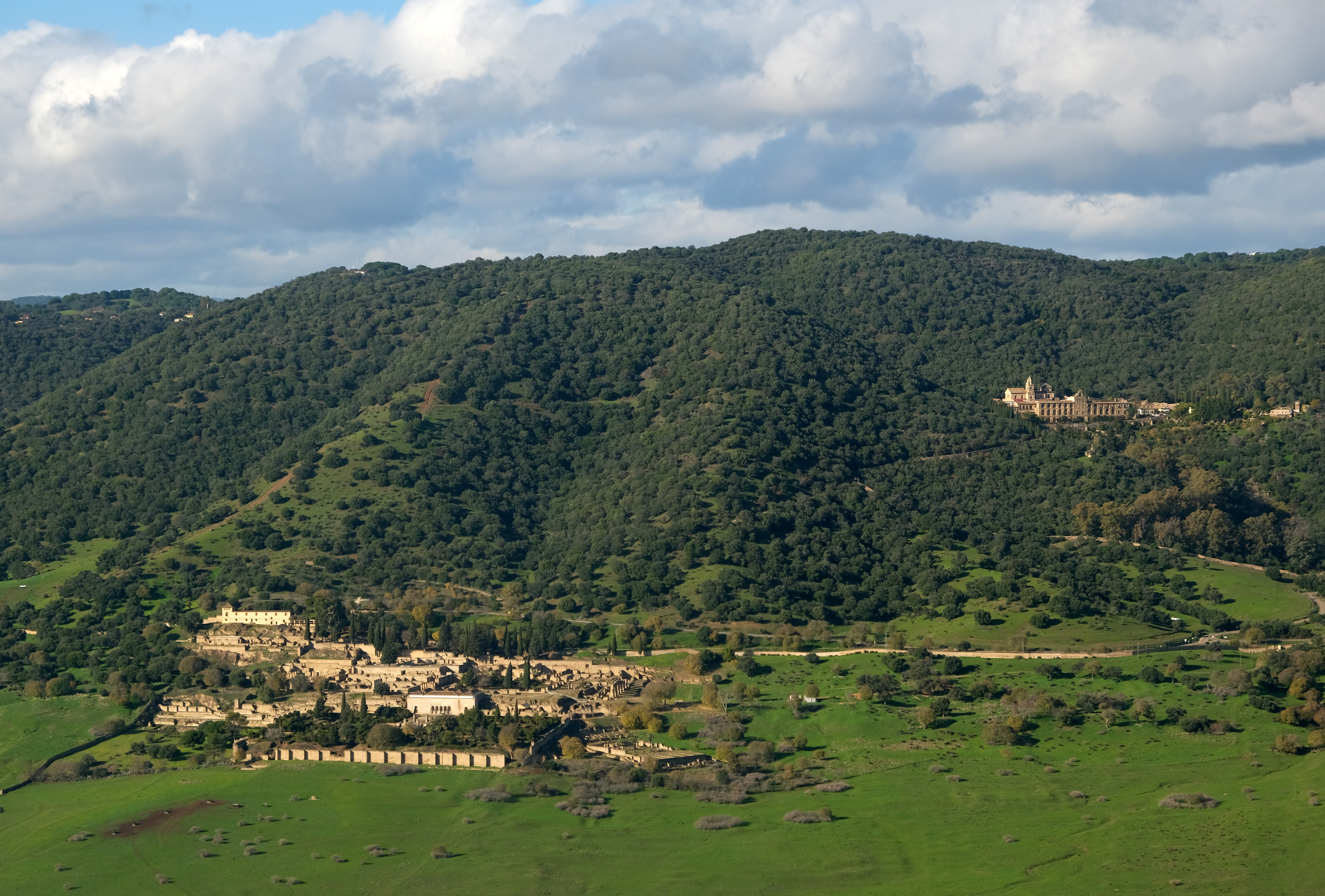
Aerial view of Medina Azahara in 2020

Located 4 miles (6.4 km) west of Córdoba in the foothills of the Sierra Morena, oriented north-to-south on the slopes of Jabal al-Arus (meaning Bride Hill), and facing the valley of the Guadalquivir river, is Madinat az-Zahra, billed as the Versailles of the Middle Ages. It was chosen for its outstanding landscape values, allowing a hierarchical construction program so the city and the plains beyond its feet were physically and visually dominated by the buildings of the Alcázar (citadel).

There was also a quarry of limestone, used for the primary construction, though other stones from an area 50 km around were also used. The city's construction led to a road, water and supply infrastructure partly preserved until today in the form of remains of roads, quarries, aqueducts and bridges.

The topography played a decisive role in shaping the city. Taking full advantage of the uneven terrain, the palace city of Madinat az-Zahra was distributed in three terraces. Unlike the labyrinthine and chaotic character typical of Muslim urbanism, the site of the city adopted a rectangular shape comprising an area of 112 hectares. It extended 1,500 metres (4,900 ft) per side from east to west and about 750 metres (2,460 ft) from north to south, just warped on the north side by the need to adapt to the difficult topography of the terrain.

Its location in the foothills of Sierra Morena made it possible to design an urban program in which the location and physical relationships between the various constructions were expressive of the role of each in the setting. The palace was located at a higher level, and staggered its buildings along the side of the mountain in an expression of clear preeminence over the urban hamlets and the congregational mosque spread across the plains below. Following the terraces, the first corresponds to the residential area of the caliph, next comes the official area including the houses of the viziers, the guard-room, administrative offices and gardens. Next is the city proper, with housing, crafts, and the great mosque of the two lower terraces separated by another wall in order to isolate the upper palace complex. Archaeological research has revealed an urban morphology characterized by the existence of large areas of undeveloped land, which serves to empty the entire southern front of the fortress, ensuring privacy and maintaining an open, idyllic country landscape. The only spaces built on the lowest level are two broad bands: the western, with an urban management orthogon, and the eastern, with less rigid planning.

There were two complexes outside but close by the city, one a large villa at the centre of a large agricultural estate, later given to the state treasurer. The other, Turruñuelos, was a huge rectangular building, perhaps a barracks.

== Architecture and layout ==
=== Overview ===
The city covered an almost rectangular area measuring 1.5 km long (roughly from east to west) and 750 wide (roughly from north to south). Its perimeter was protected by a thick stone wall with square bastions. Today only about 10 of the 112 hectares (0.43 sq mi) of the city have been excavated and restored, although this area includes the main palaces. The highest point of the city was at the centre of its northern wall (near the palaces), which is 215 meters above sea level, while the lowest point, to the south and nearer to the river, is 70 meters lower. Most of the site slopes gradually down towards the river except in the central northern zone where there were three distinct levels or terraces built into the hillside, with height differences of 10 meters or more between them. The two upper levels were known as the "Alcázar" (al-Qasr in Arabic). Most of the modern excavations have focused on the Alcázar and its palaces, and these are the areas visitors can access today.

According to historical Arabic sources, the three levels of the city had distinct functions: the uppermost level housed the private palaces of the caliph and his closest associates, the middle terrace housed the buildings of the state administration and the residences of high officials, and the much larger lower level was for the common people and the army. This design expressed the social and political hierarchy of the caliphate through the topography of the city itself. In practice, however, the division between levels was not so clear-cut as there were also many differences in elevation within each level. There also appears to be a division between the eastern and western sectors of the Alcázar, separated by a north-south axis that was aligned with the northern gate of the city. The eastern zone comprised the "official" sector, occupied by administrative and reception buildings, and the western zone served as the "private" sector, occupied by private residences of the caliph and his court.

Plan of the city

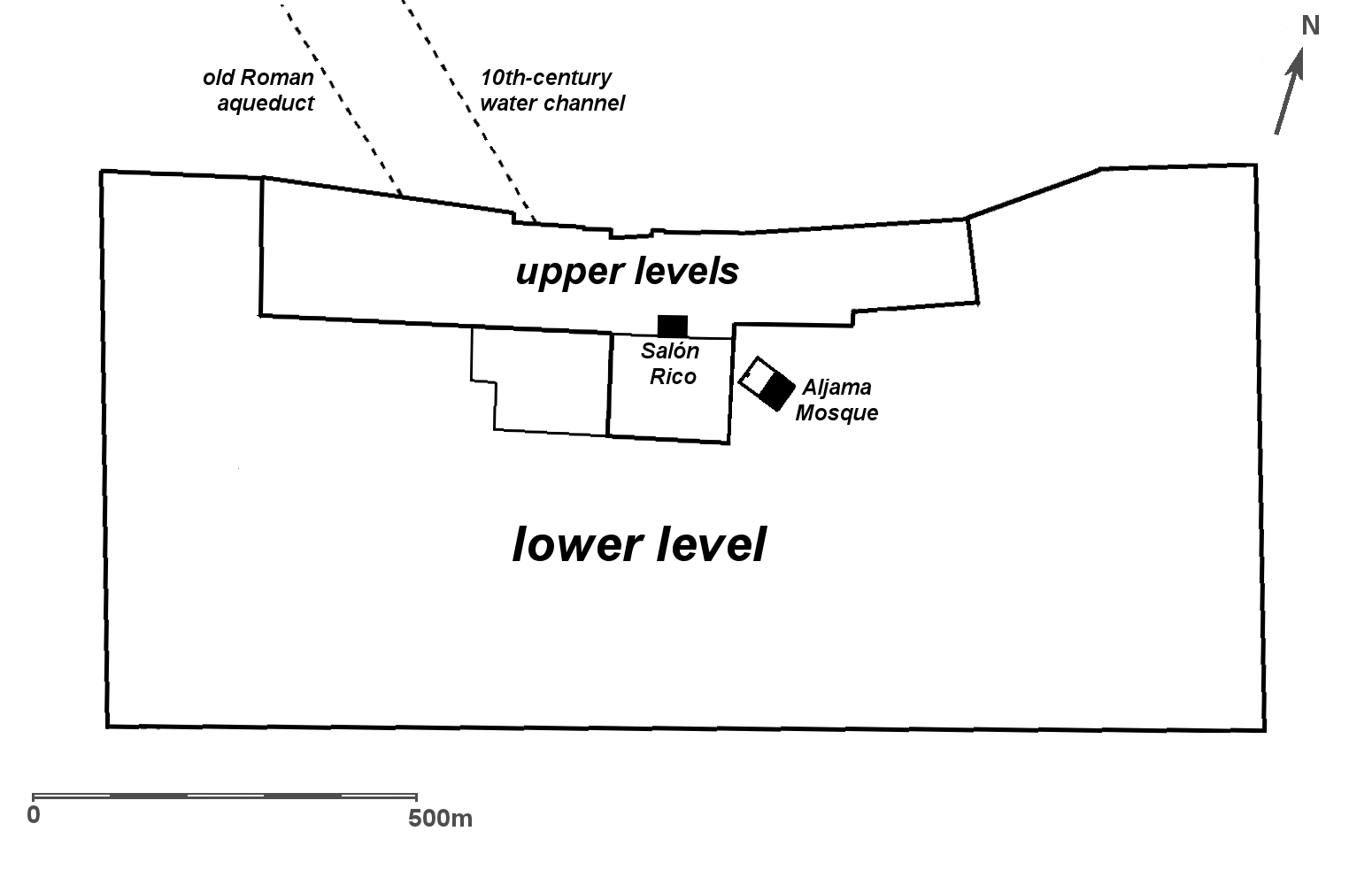
Overall outline and division of the city

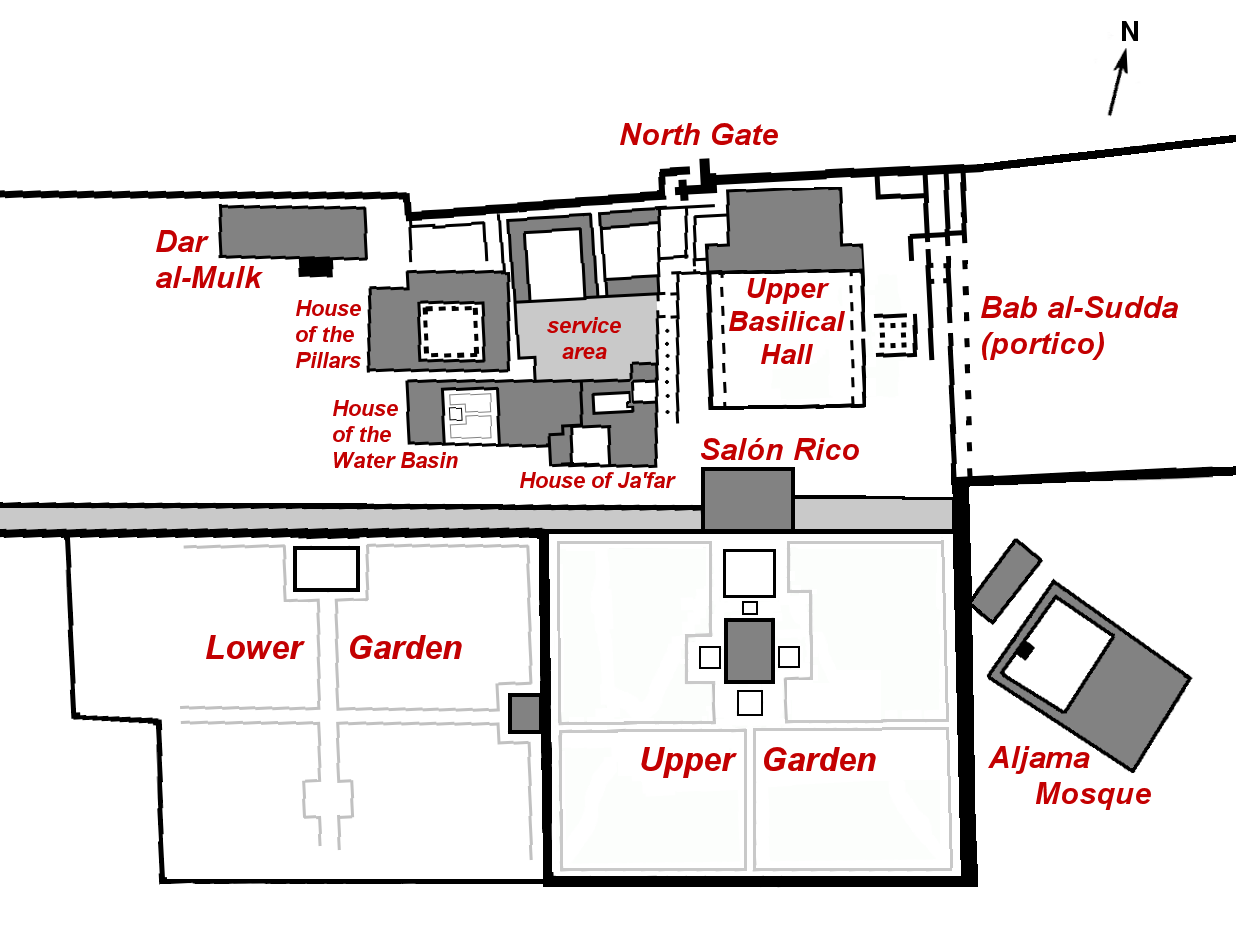
Major excavated structures in the Alcazar (upper palace areas)

=== The lower level ===
The city's lower level was much larger than the Alcázar area and occupied most of the space within the perimeter wall. It was further divided into three zones. The western zone, about 200 meters wide from east to west, housed the army and its barracks. The central zone, about 600 meters wide and located to the south of the palaces above, was occupied by gardens and orchards. The eastern zone, about 700 meters wide, was an urbanized area that housed the general population and including the main congregational mosque and the markets. Recent excavations have also uncovered the remains of a smaller neighborhood mosque in the southeastern part of the city. Aside from the North Gate which led to the palaces, at least two other gates in the city's outer wall are known: the Bab al-Qubba ("Gate of the Dome") in the middle of the southern wall and the Bab al-Shams ("Gate of the Sun") in the eastern wall.

==== The congregational mosque ====
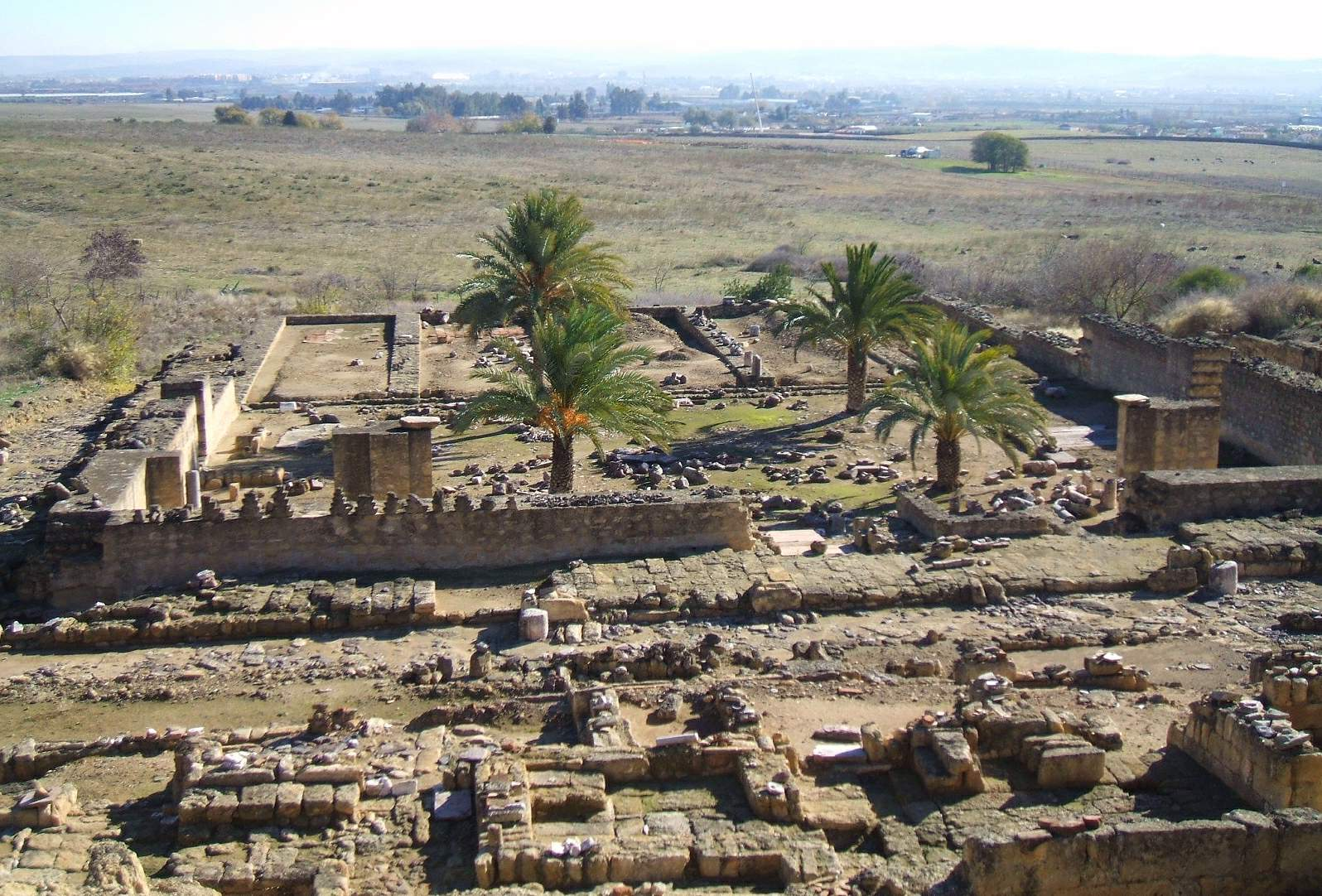
The remains of the congregational mosque, seen from the northwest

The city's main congregational mosque (sometimes referred to as the Aljama Mosque) was located on the lower level just east of the Upper Garden and Salón Rico complex. It could be reached from the palaces via a covered ramp passage in the eastern wall of the Upper Garden's terrace. Other roads led to the mosque from the rest of the city around it. Like the Great Mosque of Córdoba, a private passage allowed for the caliph to enter the mosque directly into the maqsura, the privileged area near the mihrab. The mosque had a rectangular floor plan aligned northwest to southeast, in accordance with the qibla (direction of prayer). This orientation is notably different from the southern qibla orientation of the much older Great Mosque of Córdoba, which reflects that conceptions of the qibla changed over time in this part of the Islamic world. Outside the mosque, on its northwest side and near the entrance, is a set of facilities which provided for the ritual of ablutions.

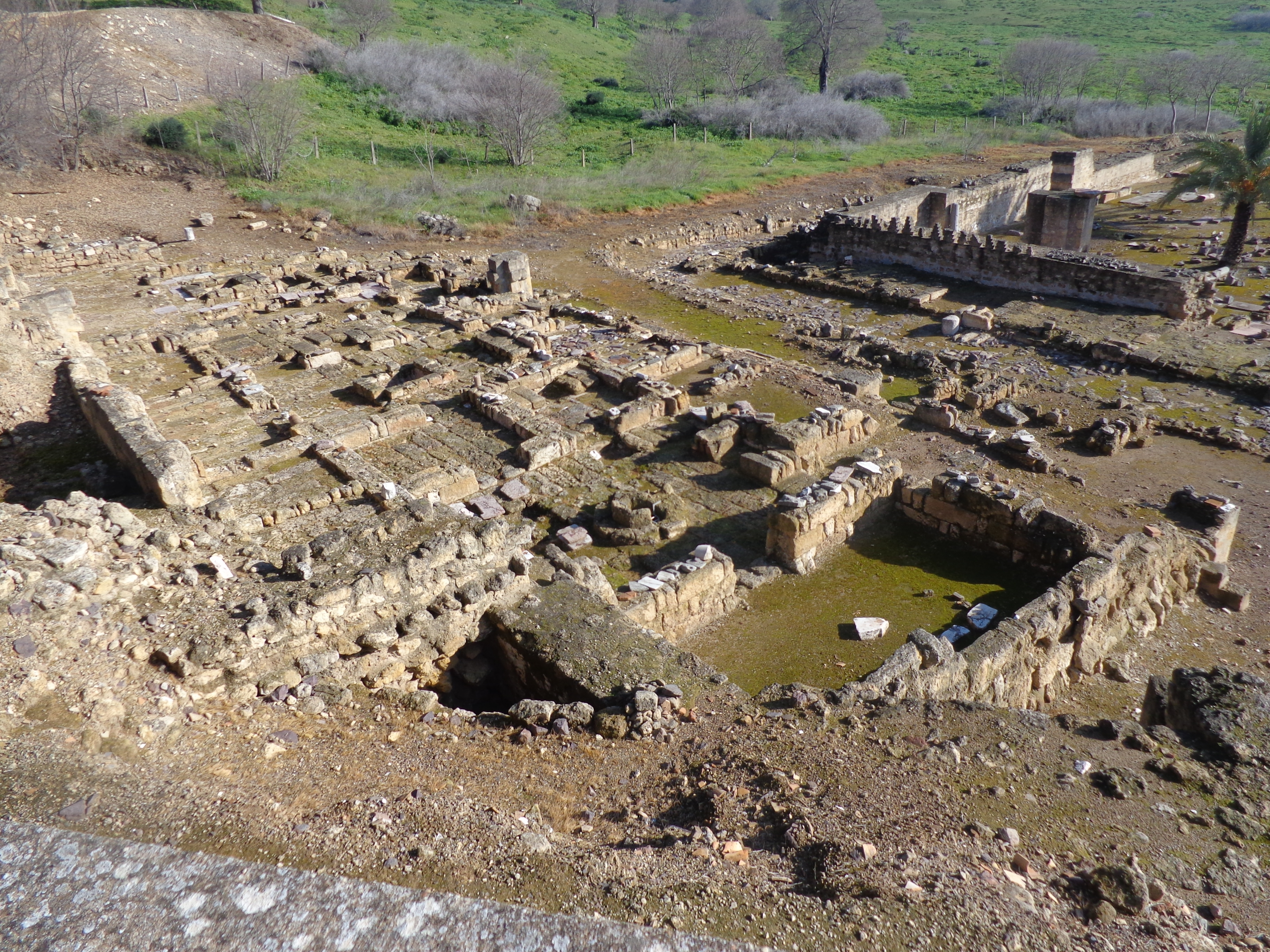
Remains of the ablutions facilities on the northwest side of the mosque

The mosque building was divided between an open courtyard (sahn) to the northwest and an interior prayer hall to the southeast. The mosque was entered via three gates that led into the courtyard and were located on the courtyard's central axes: two lateral gates (to the northeast and southwest) and one on the main central axis of the mosque itself (to the northwest). The latter gate was flanked on one side by a minaret with a square base. This is the earliest evidence of such a minaret being used in the architecture of al-Andalus, as it is older even than the minaret Abd ar-Rahman III later built for the Great Mosque in Córdoba. The base of the minaret measures 5 meters per side, and according to historical sources (Al-Maqqari in particular) it originally stood approximately 20 meters high. The mosque's prayer hall was divided by rows of arches into five parallel "naves". Archeological evidence has shown that the arches were double-tiered, emulating the same design feature seen in the Great Mosque of Córdoba. The middle nave, in front of what would have been the mihrab (wall niche symbolizing the direction of prayer), was wider than the other four naves of the mosque.

=== The upper levels (palace areas) ===
==== Gates and entrances ====
===== North Gate =====
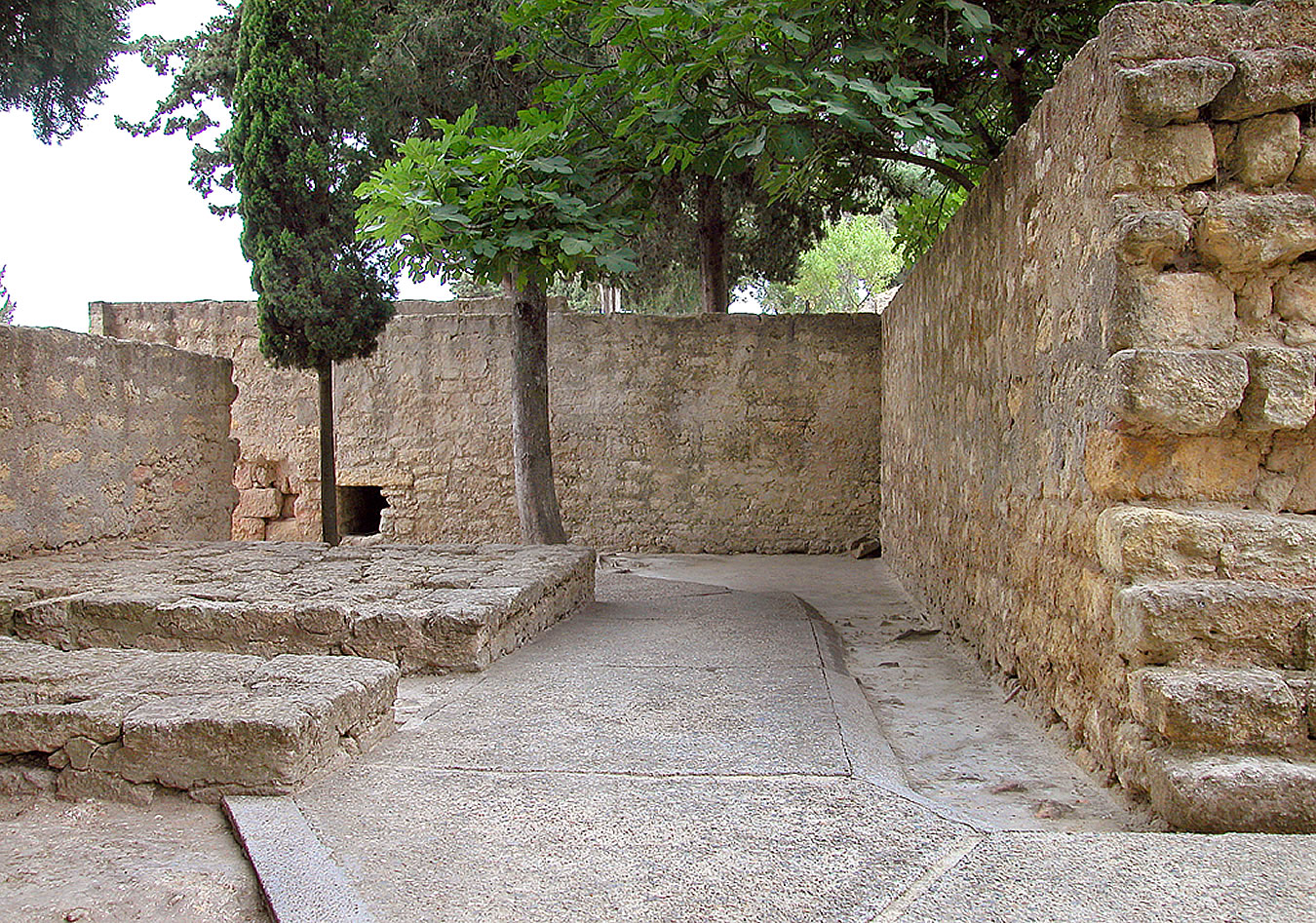
Remains of the North Gate, the main entrance to the site for visitors today

The northern gate of the city, Bab al-Jibal ("Gate of the Mountains"), was located at the highest point of the city and granted access directly into the middle of the Alcázar or palace area of the city. It is also known as the North Gate (Puerta Norte in Spanish). It had a bent entrance layout and was defended by a tower. Today it acts as the main entrance to the site for visitors and tourists. To the west of the gate was the caliph's private palace (the Dar al-Mulk) and to the east was the administrative district and the Upper Basilical Hall (the Dar al-Jund).

===== Bab al-Sudda (eastern portico) =====
The official and ceremonial entrance to the palace areas, however, was located further east and was known as Bab al-Sudda ("Forbidden Gate" or "Gate of the Threshold"). This gate formed one end of the long road which led between the palaces and the city of Córdoba to the east, and it is believed to be the entrance where ambassadors or guests were received. The gate consisted of a monumental portico: a long row of huge horseshoe arches running roughly north-to-south. It was fronted by a large open esplanade, known today as the Plaza de Armas (a later Spanish term) but referred to in sources as a ḫaṣṣa (open area), probably originally serving a similar function as a mechouar (a term later used in the Maghreb) or a maydan. It would have hosted public ceremonies, military parades, and executions. On top of the gate's portico structure was a viewing platform where the caliph could sit and observe events on the plaza below. Inside the gate, a ramped street then led up to the terrace of the Upper Basilical Hall.

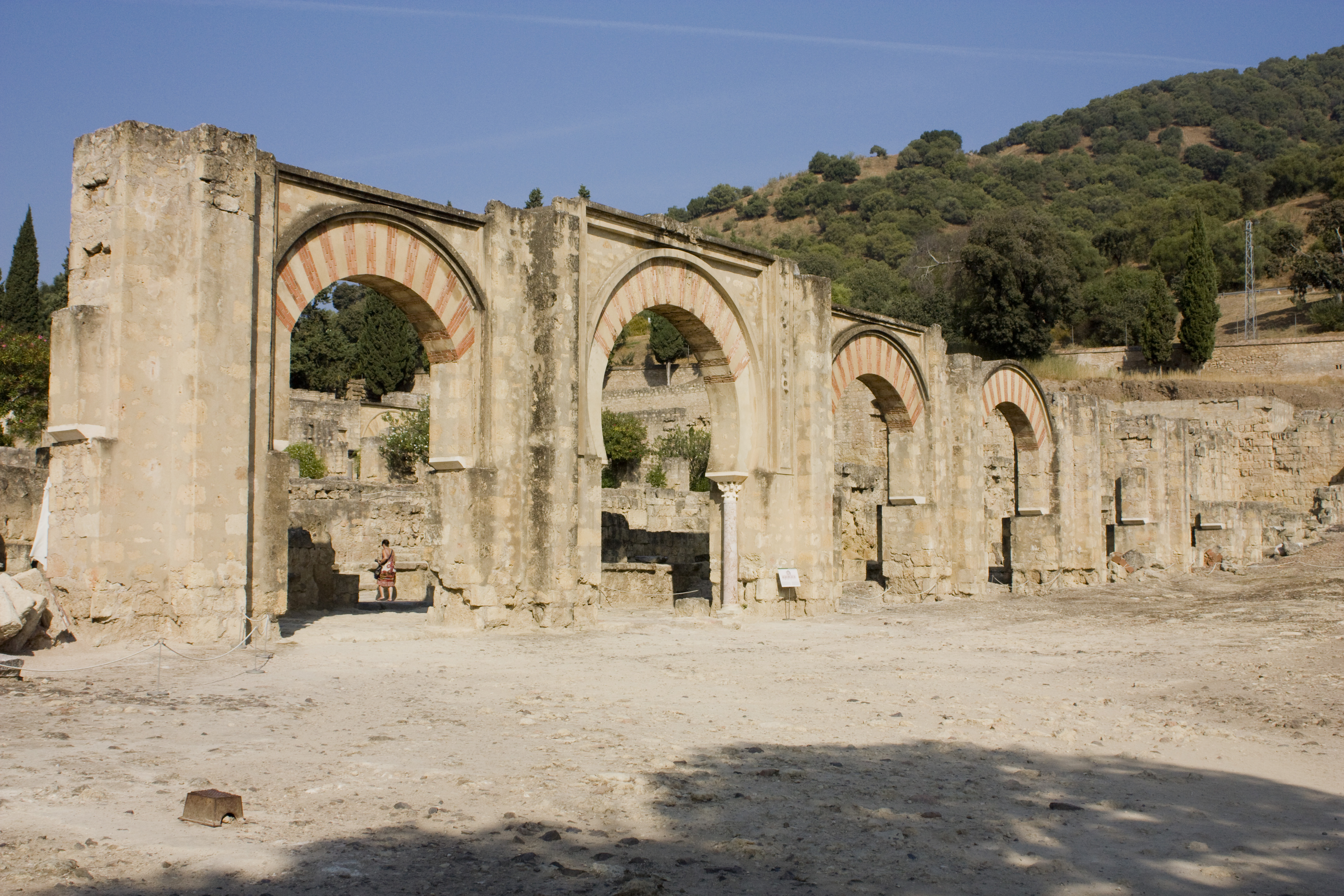
Bab al-Sudda, the great eastern portico which served as the ceremonial entrance to the Alcazar

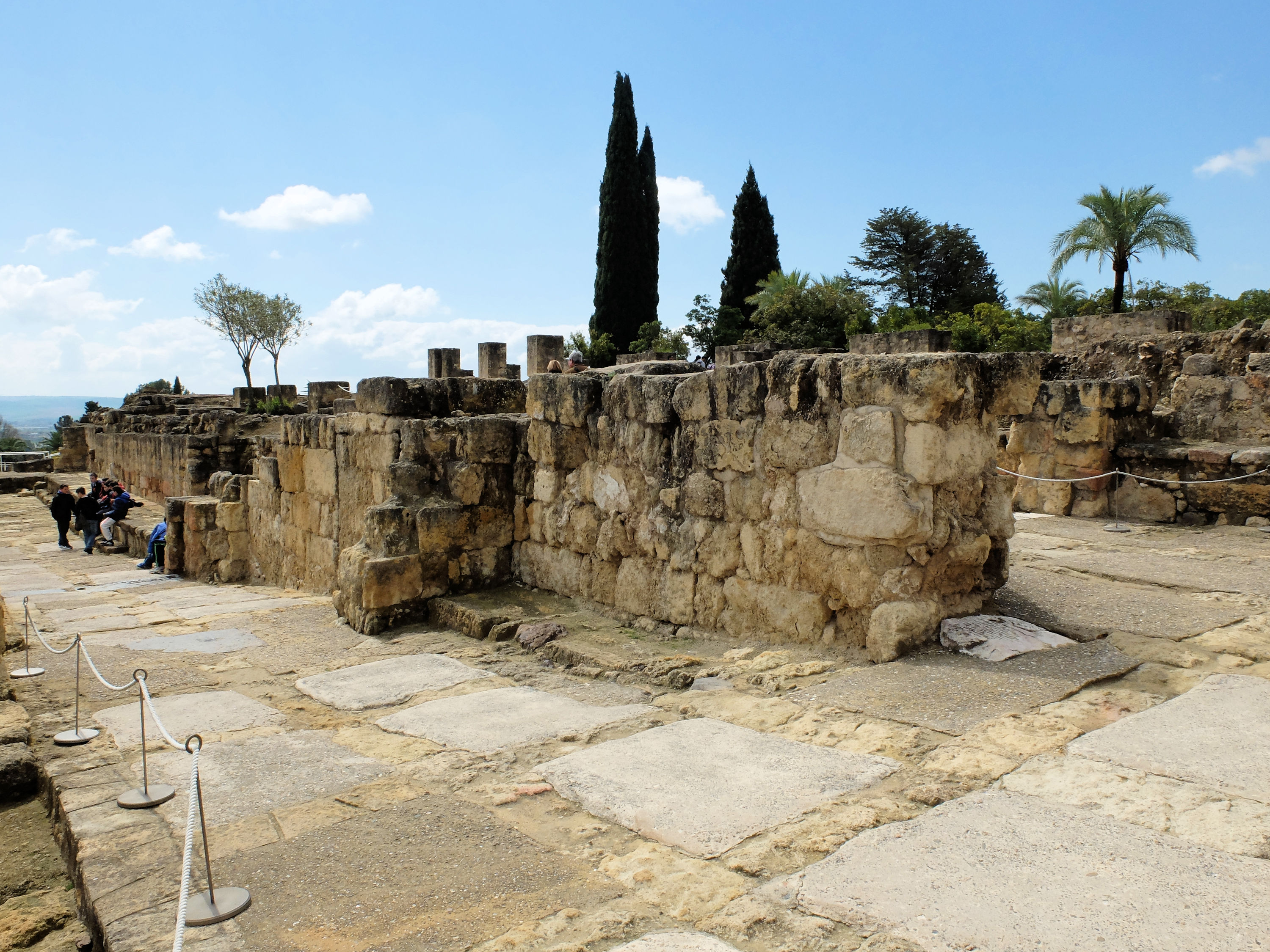
The ramped street leading from Bab al-Sudda to the terrace of the Upper Basilical Hall

==== Upper Basilical Hall (Dar al-Jund) ====
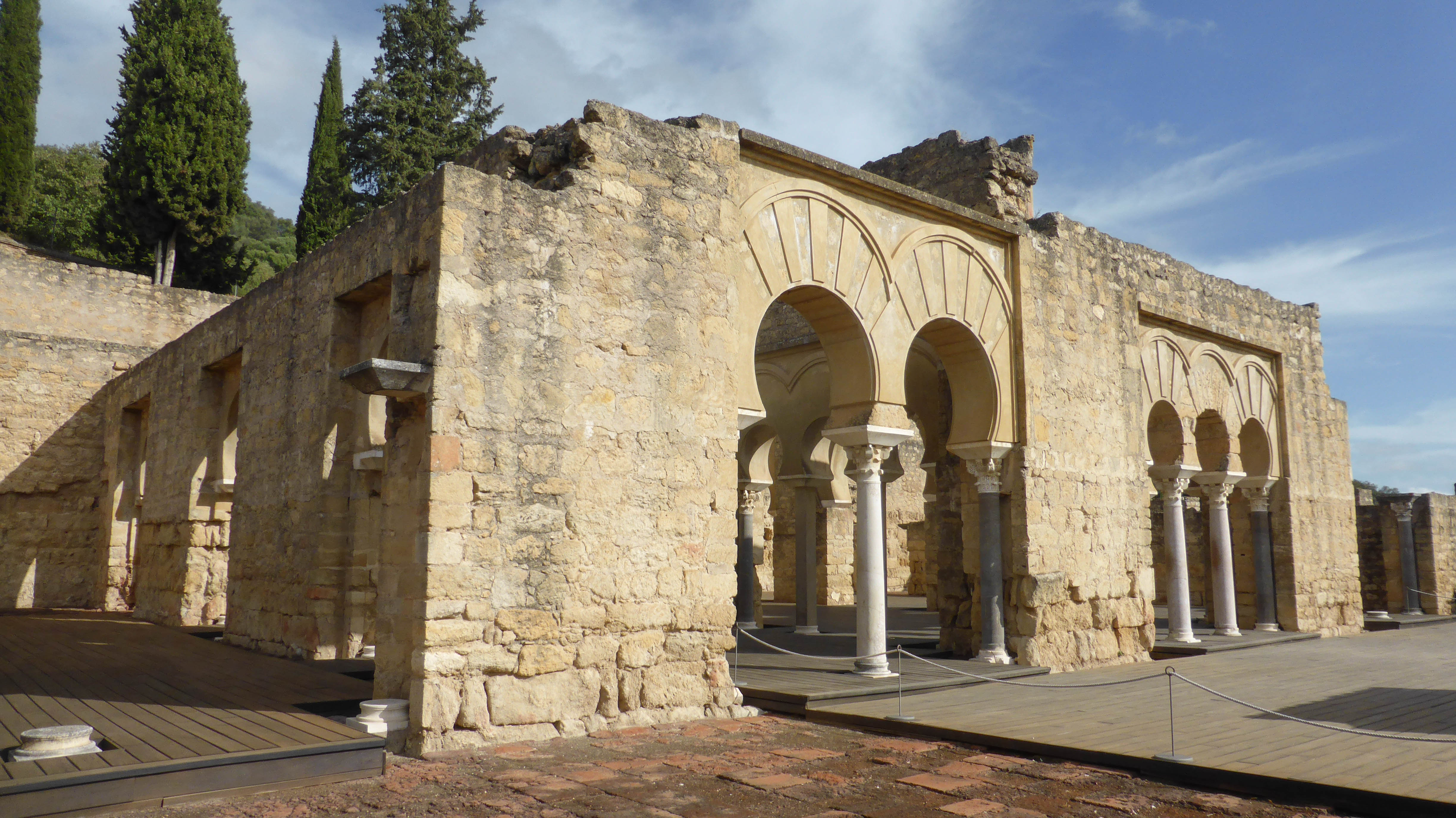
Exterior view of the Upper Basilical Hall or Dar al-Jund, partly reconstructed today

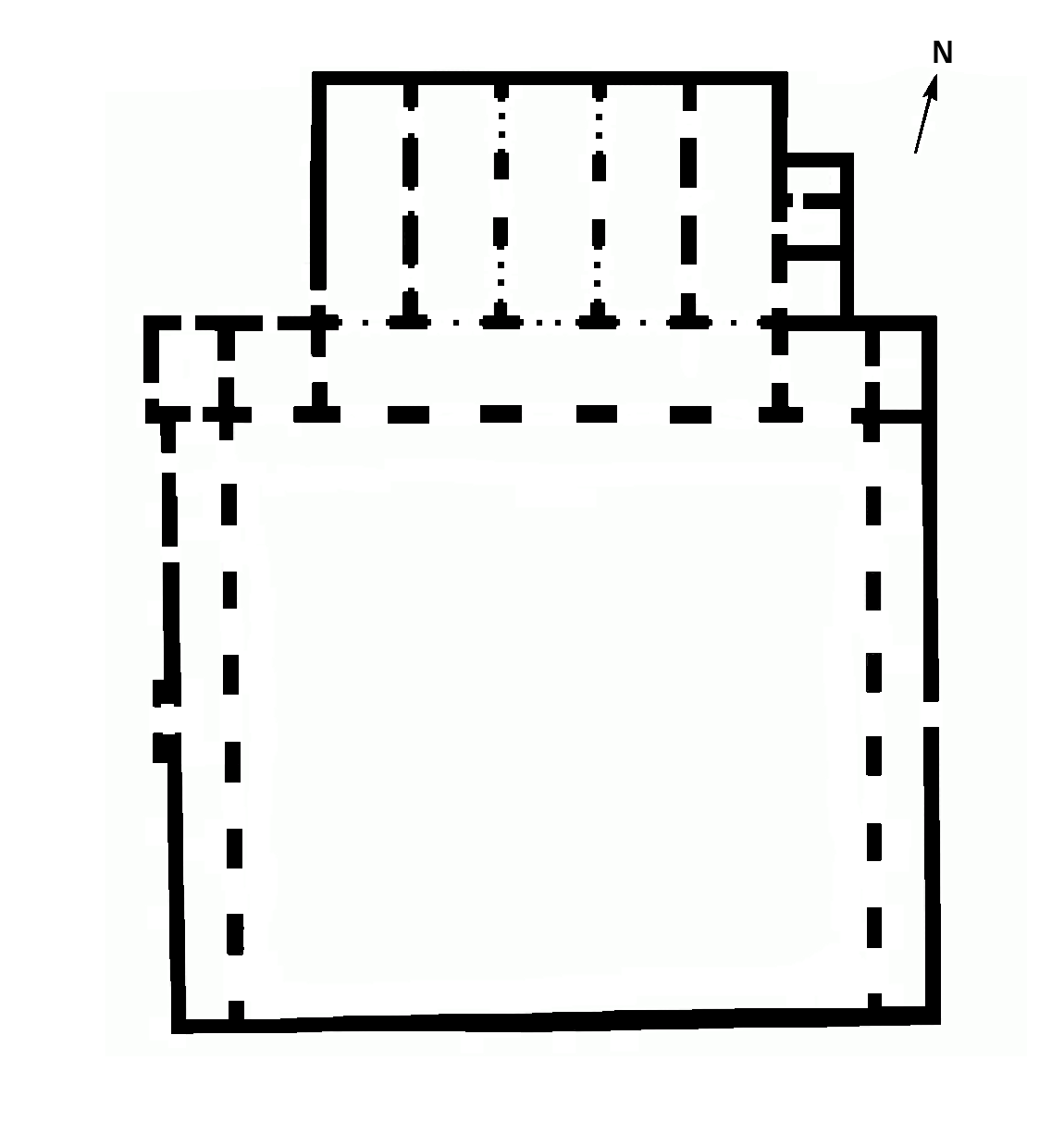
Floor plan of the Upper Basilical Hall

The structure known today as the "Upper Basilical Hall" has been identified, tentatively, as the Dar al-Jund ("House of the Army" in Arabic), a name mentioned in literary sources. It was probably built in the 950s during a new program of construction and state reform.

The exact function of this large structure is uncertain, but scholars and archeologists have traditionally assumed that it had an administrative or official (semi-public) function, such as a reception chamber for ceremonies and for ambassadors on their way to see the caliph. The Dar al-Jund is mentioned in historical sources as an assembly hall for the officers of the caliph's army. Felix Arnold, an archeologist and scholar on the topic of Islamic palace architecture in the region, suggests that the building's size means that it must have been the main audience hall of Madinat al-Zahra, which might identify it instead with either the Majlis ash-Sharqi ("Eastern Hall") or Majlis al-Gharbi ("Western Hall") mentioned in historical sources.

The building is located near the northeastern corner of the excavated area today, on a terrace west of the Bab al-Sudda entrance. It consists of a large basilica-type structure to the north adjoined to a large open courtyard to the south. Visitors to the city reached this area by walking up a ramped street that started on the central axis of the Bab al-Sudda gate and climbed its way to the terrace above, bending 180 degrees several times along the way. The ramp was wide enough and its slope gentle enough to allow visitors to remain on horseback, and was even lined with benches where they could sit and wait their turn to enter. It ended at a small porticoed court, where the visitors were possibly assigned to new guides, and from which they then entered into the courtyard of the Dar al-Jund along its middle axis. Felix Arnold suggests that this overall layout had a precedent in the older Alcázar of Córdoba, where visitors coming from the main public entrance to the west arrived into a courtyard or garden in front of the Majlis al-Kamil ("Perfect Hall"), the main audience chamber of the palace.

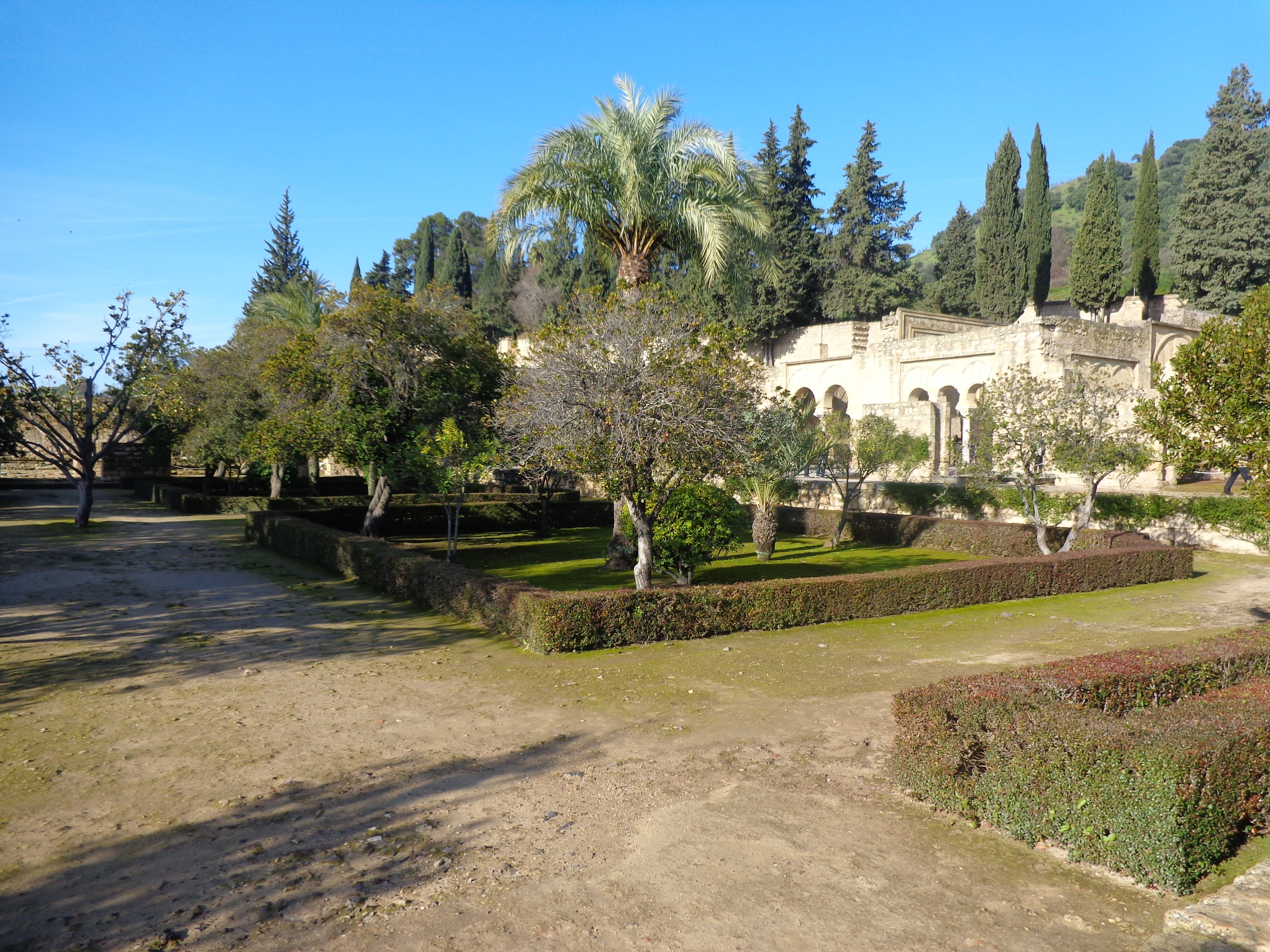
Present-day gardens occupying the former courtyard in front of the Upper Basilical Hall

The courtyard of the Dar al-Jund measures 54.5 meters wide and 51 meters deep. Its northern side is occupied by the broad entrance façade of the main hall, its western and eastern sides were occupied by narrow porticos, and its southern side was closed by a simple wall. The main hall stood 1.2 meters above the level of the courtyard. Stairs and ramps leading to its platform were located at the northern corners of the courtyard – the stairs were for those on foot, the ramps for horses. The remains of the courtyard were converted into a garden in the 1960s.

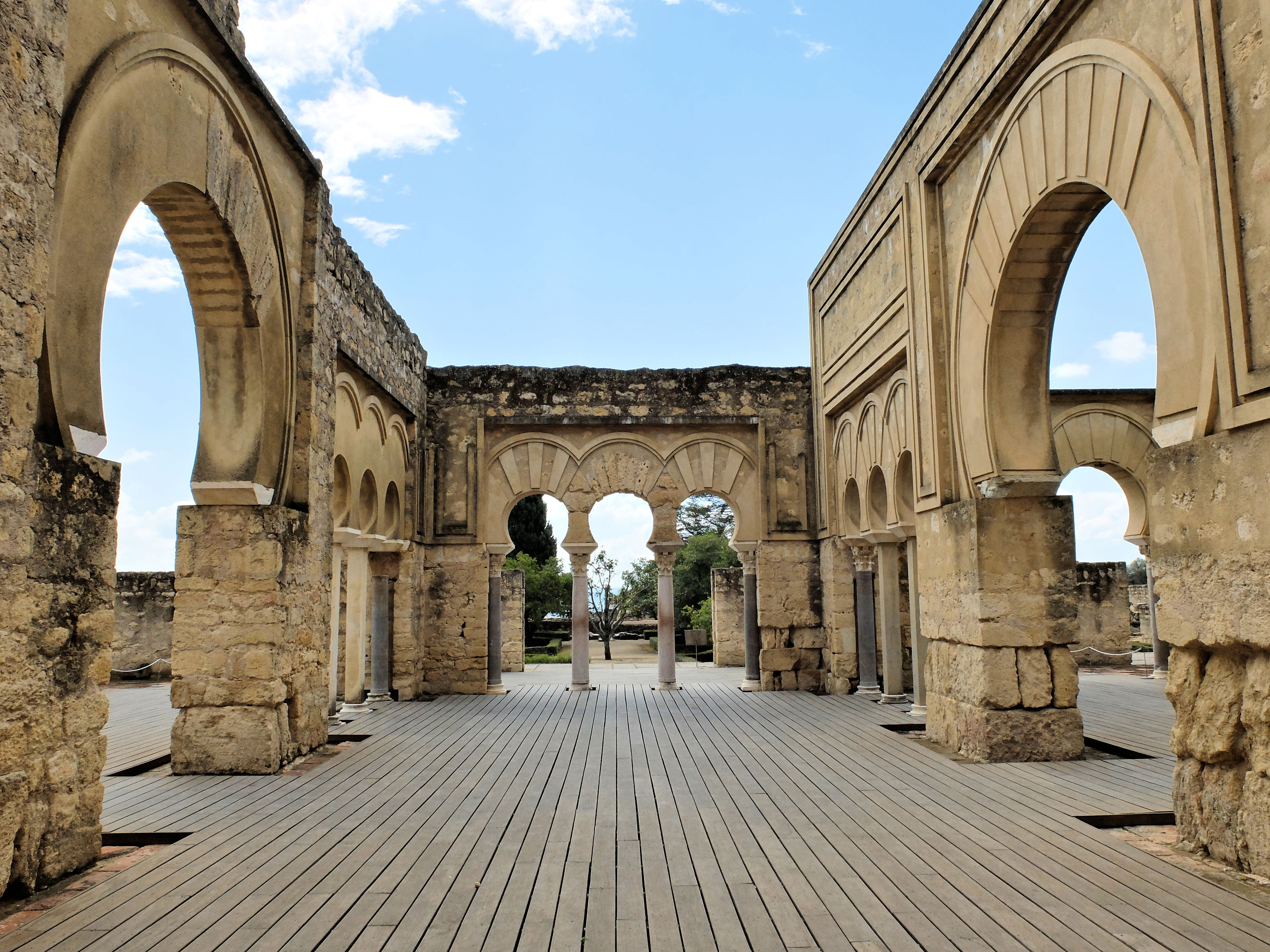
Interior of the central nave of the Upper Basilical Hall

The main hall itself is the largest interior space ever documented in the historic palace architecture of the western Islamic world, being large enough to accommodate up to 3000 people. The hall is composed of five parallel rectangular chambers, placed side-by-side and open to each other through various archways. Each chamber is about 20 meters long (from north to south) and 6.8 meters wide, with the exception of the central chamber which is about 7.5 meters wide. Each hall opens onto a sixth chamber to the south, perpendicular to the others, which is about 30 meters long (from east to west) and 6.9 meters wide, with a smaller square chamber located at either end. This south hall opens onto the courtyard to the south through five broad archways. Other auxiliary rooms are present nearby. The decoration of the building was plain in comparison with other royal edifices in the city. The walls were made of stone and plastered, with little ornamentation other than a red dado near the base, while the floors were paved in brick instead of stone. Only the capitals of the columns were ornately carved. However, the walls may have originally been covered with ornamental furnishings such as tapestries and curtains may have been draped across the arches.

The precise intentions of the hall's design are ambiguous, as the chambers are all connected to each other but in slightly different ways. The central chamber is wider than the others and its entrance from the south is marked by a triple archway instead of a double archway like the other four parallel chambers, which actually made the openings between the columns narrower for the central chamber than for the others. The three middle chambers are also each connected to each other though a wide central door flanked by triple archways with columns, while the two outermost chambers at the sides are connected to the inner chambers through three simple doors. During official receptions, the caliph likely sat in the middle of the back wall of the central chamber. Antonio Vallejo Triano argues that the overall design of the building suggests that the two outermost chambers, along with the southern chamber at the front, formed a U-shaped space around the three central chambers and that the latter formed a privileged space for the caliph's audience. He also adds that there is archeological evidence that the spaces of the two outermost chambers were actually divided into two stories. Felix Arnold, in a slightly different interpretation, suggests that visitors entered the building from the sides and then entered the central chamber by moving from the outermost chambers to the central one, with each wall of doors and archways acting as a "screen" through which they passed closer to the caliph.

==== Dar al-Mulk ====
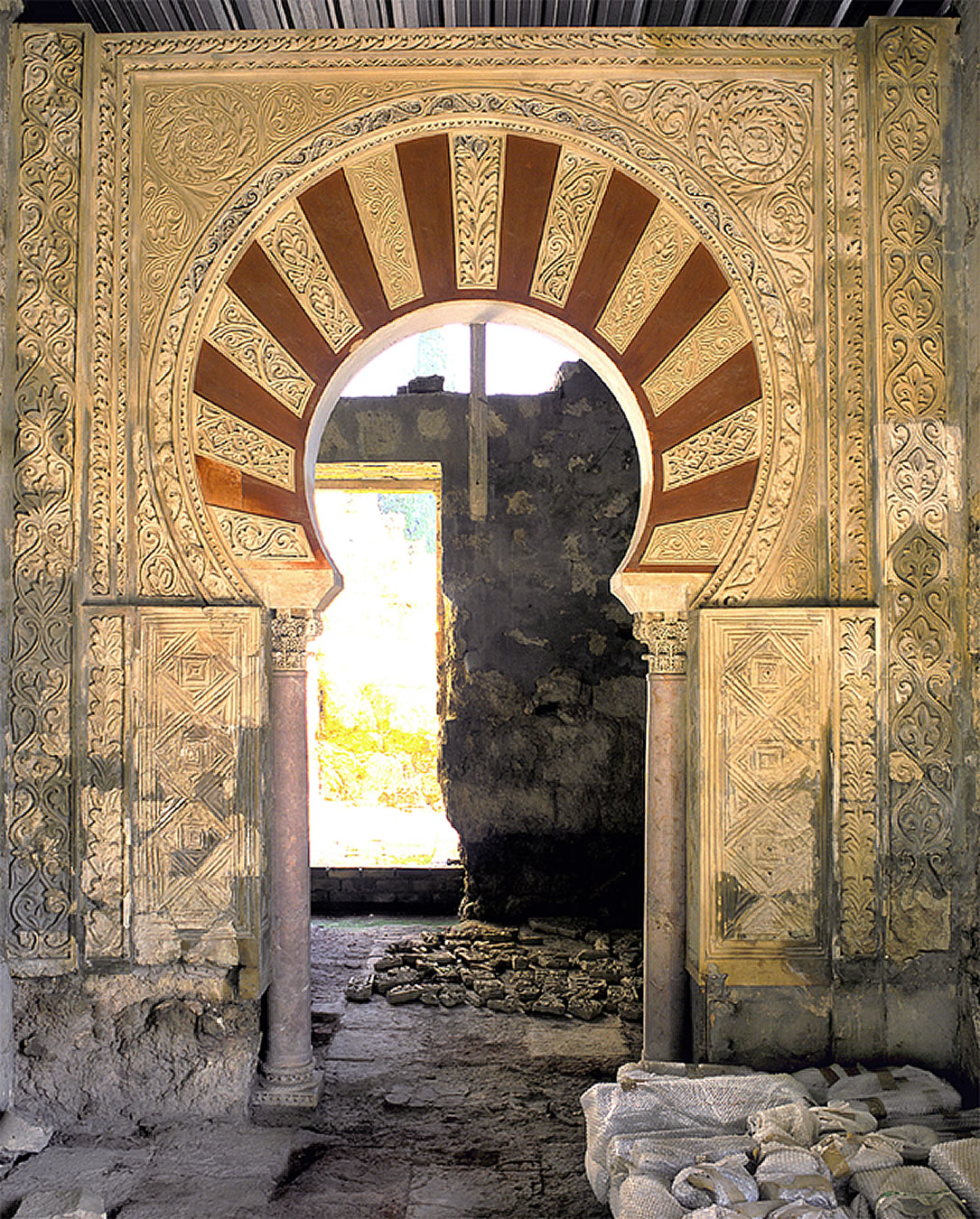
Decorated archway inside the Dar al-Mulk

The Dar al-Mulk or "Royal House" is a palace described in historical sources. Archeologists have identified it, tentatively, with the structure located on the highest terrace of the city, in the northwest extremity of the excavated area today. It is believed to have been one of the earliest structures built on the site and it was one of the first to be excavated in 1911. Historical sources also record that the Dar al-Mulk was repurposed in 972 to serve as a venue where prince Hisham, the future successor of al-Hakam II, was educated.

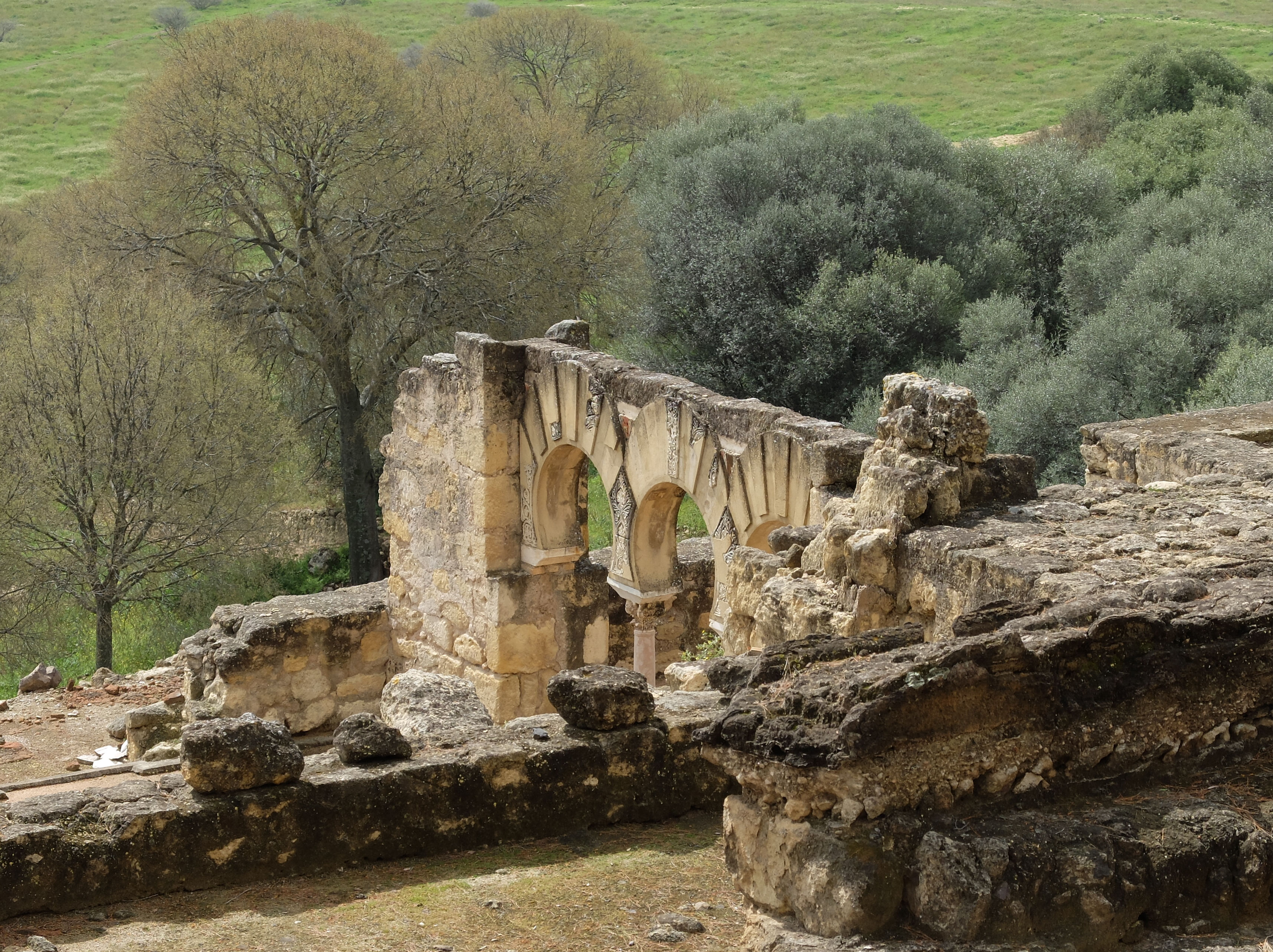
Portico in the eastern apartment of the Dar al-Mulk

The main structure consisted of three parallel rectangular halls oriented east-west. The halls were entered from the south: the southern walls of the first two halls each had three openings or doorways of equal size aligned in a row. The third hall, at the back, was much smaller and had only one door, which was aligned with the middle doors of the other two halls. Each hall was also flanked on both sides by small square (or nearly square) chambers. The first main hall may have served as an entrance hall, the second one may have been a reception room, and the third hall may have been a private sitting area whose side rooms served as bedrooms. The second and third halls have been partly reconstructed today, but the first (southernmost) hall has been lost. It stood at the very edge of the terrace, 15 meters above the ground of the next level below. In front of the eastern corner of this hall, however, are the remains of a staircase that led down to the terrace below. On the east side of the main structure is another apartment consisting of a courtyard, a portico of arches, and a hall, which was built over a former bathhouse

The building was richly decorated. The doorways, some rectangular and some arched, were framed with geometric and vegetal (arabesque) decoration, and the floors were paved with geometric patterns. The exterior façade of the building, which faced south over the edge of the terrace wall, had three decorated doorways as well as a blind arcade of false windows above. Felix Arnold notes that because the doorways of the three halls were aligned with each other and faced outwards from the edge of the palace terrace, they would have offered views of the distant horizon across the valley, but not onto a private garden or courtyard as was typical in many Islamic palaces in the history of the region. He notes, however, that such elevated halls with distant views had precedents in the old Alcázar of Córdoba as well as at ar-Rusafa, an older Umayyad palatial estate in the countryside of Córdoba.

==== Court of the Pillars and nearby buildings ====
Located on a lower level southeast of the Dar al-Mulk, the Court of the Pillars is a structure centered around a large square courtyard which is ringed with a portico on all sides. On three sides of the courtyard, behind the portico, are wide rectangular halls. A staircase in the northwest corner led to a second story with a similar layout. Various Roman sculptures, including sarcophagi, were also discovered in this building. Among the notable finds are the fragments of a sarcophagus known as the Sarcophagus of Meleager, which has been reconstructed and kept at the site today. The building itself was built over what were initially two smaller houses. Its construction may date to the 950s, either at the same time as or after the construction of the Salón Rico. To the north of this building is another residential complex, and east of that (close to the north gate) are two other courtyard houses separated by a ramp between them.

The function of all these courtyard buildings, which were not typical of other structures in Madinat al-Zahra, is uncertain. They may have been the residences of state officials or they may have been used as guesthouses for important visitors. Art historian Susan Calvo Capilla has also suggested that the presence of Roman sculptures in the Court of the Pillars, which included representations of the Muses and philosophers, may indicate that the space was used for education and intellectual activities, with the sculptures placed here as a deliberate reference to ancient sciences. The Court of the Clocks, located to southeast near the Salón Rico, was similarly decorated with Roman sculptures.

==== House of the Water Basin ====
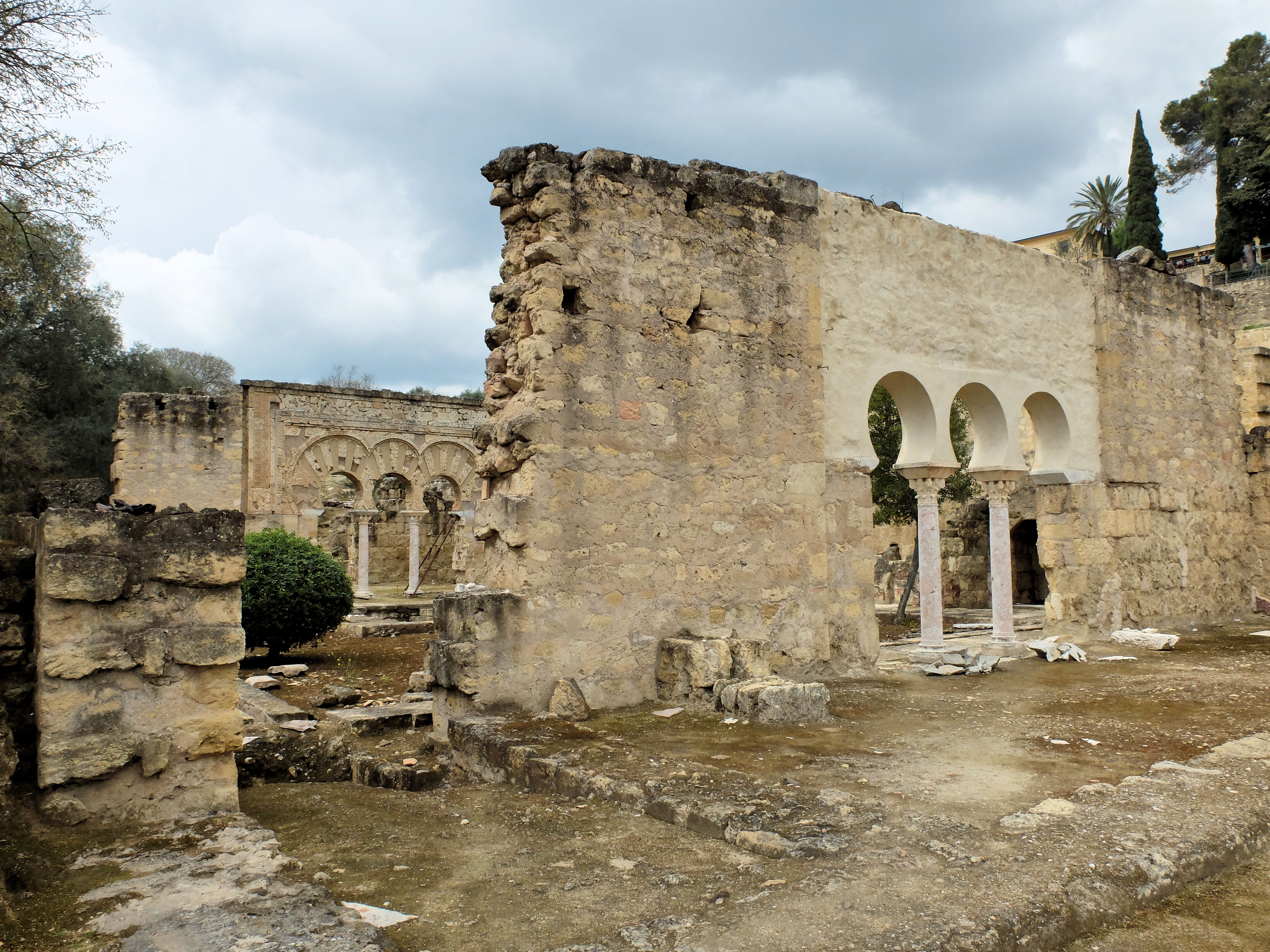
The reconstructed remains of the House of the Water Basin, showing the two porticos that stood on either side of the central courtyard

The House of the Water Basin (Vivienda de la Alberca in Spanish) is a structure located south of the Court of the Pillars. It was part of a complex of residences which stood between the Dar al-Mulk and the Salón Rico. The house is believed to date from the first years of construction at Madinat al-Zahra, although parts of the floor plan were likely modified afterwards. Antonio Vallejo Triano has proposed that this house was a residence of al-Hakam II before he became caliph in 961. The site was excavated by Félix Hernández Jiménez and Rafael Manzano Martos between 1975 and 1982 and, as of 2018, was still being examined by archeologists.

The building is laid out along an east-west axis and is centered around a square courtyard. Its original entrance was on the north side and led directly into the courtyard. On both the west and east sides were two rectangular chambers, one behind the other, whose entrances were aligned with the central axis of the courtyard. Smaller chambers were also located along the sides of the building. Behind the eastern chambers was a private bathhouse or hammam which consisted of three chambers of decreasing size, heated using the traditional Roman hypocaust system under its marble floors. Marble decoration was added to the bath by Ja'far in 961-62.

The courtyard of the house was occupied by two symmetrical sunken gardens and by a water basin at the middle of the courtyard's western side, after which the house is named. The gardens were surrounded by raised walkways that ran around the edge of the courtyard and were split by another walkway down the middle between them. Water channels also ran along the edges of the courtyard and brought water to the basin. The gardens were planted with low-growing plants like lavender, oleander, myrtle, basil, and celery. The main halls on either side were accessed through an arcade with three horseshoe arches resting on columns, partly reconstructed today. The arches are framed by an alfiz filled with carved vegetal ornamentation. D. Fairchild Ruggles, a scholar of historic Islamic gardens, indicates that the garden of this house is also known as the "Prince's Garden" and may have been enjoyed by elite residents of the palaces.

==== House of Ja'far ====
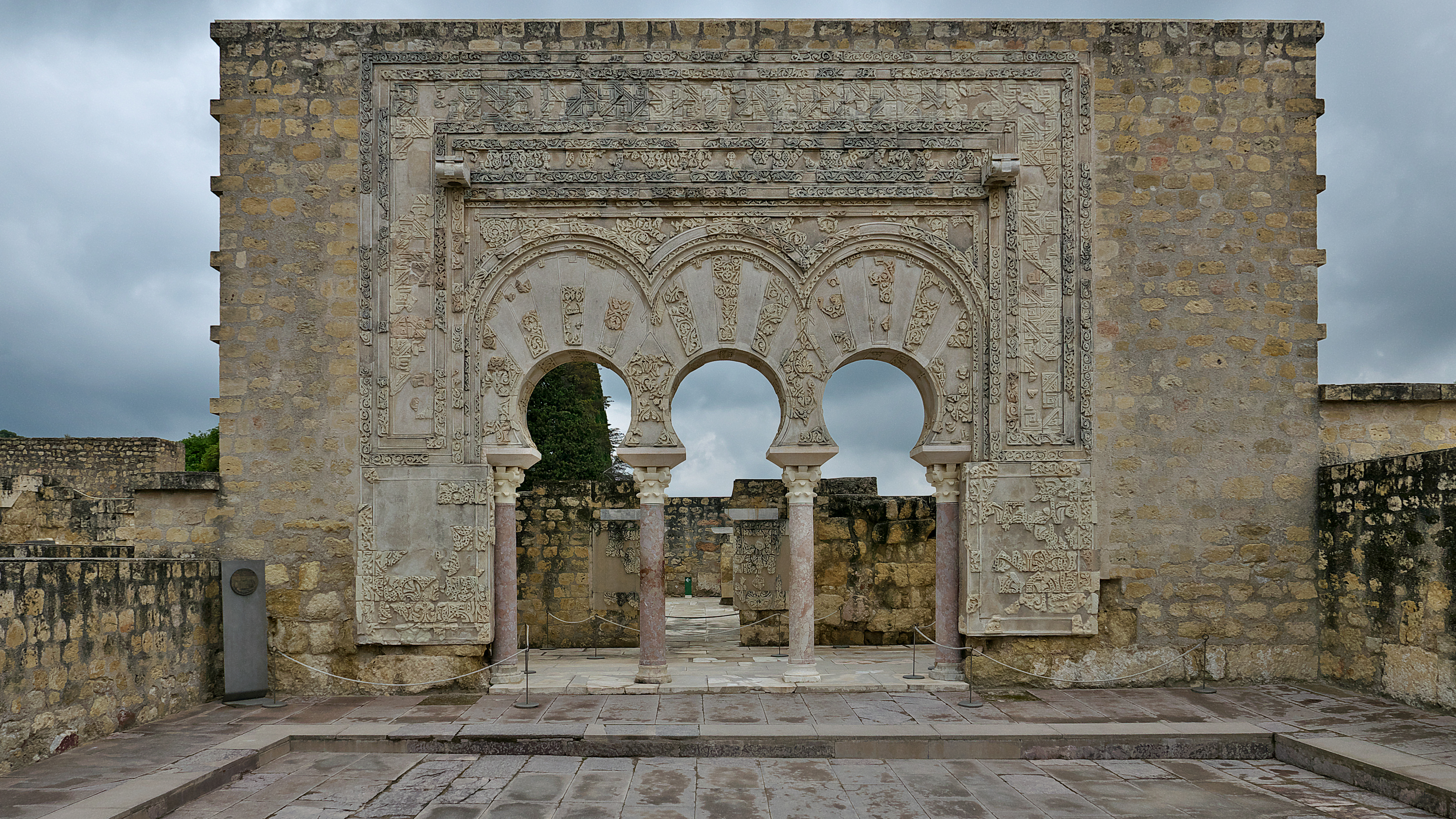
Reconstructed portico in the main courtyard of the House of Ja'far

The large "House of Ja'far" was built over what were originally three smaller houses. It is located between the Court of the Pillars to the northwest and the Salón Rico to the southeast. Because of its more evolved decoration its construction has been dated to after 961, during the reign of al-Hakam II, which may support a hypothesis by Félix Hernández Giménez that this large residence was built for the eponymous Ja'far, a hajib (chamberlain) of Caliph al-Hakam II between 961 and 971. It was excavated in 1970 by Hernandez Giménez. The decorated portico of the main courtyard has been reconstructed since 1996 under the direction of Antonio Vallejo Triano.

The building consists of three areas which each had their own internal courtyard. The first, the larger southern portion, is believed to have been dedicated to official business and receptions. It was entered from the west and was centered around a square courtyard paved in violet limestone. A second story may have also existed here, as suggested by the presence of a staircase. On the east side of the courtyard is an elaborately decorated portico, reconstructed since 1996, which led to three rectangular receptions rooms on the other side. Behind these rooms were smaller square rooms. One of those rooms included a latrine, while another gave access to the other parts of the house. These other areas were accessed by passing through a smaller square courtyard in the northeast part of the house which had a circular water basin at its center. On the north side of this courtyard was a private apartment, occupying the northeast corner of the house. On the west side of the courtyard was a larger rectangular courtyard, surrounded by rooms, which served as a service area used by servants and staff. Antonio Vallejo Triano has argued that the plan of the house indicates that it was not a family dwelling but rather designed for a single high-ranking occupant.

==== The service area ====
To the north of the House of Ja'far is a complex of rooms and houses which have been classified as a service area, although little is known of how the palace servants were organized. There appear to be two main buildings that make up the complex. The presence of kitchens is indicated by the discovery of stone ovens in some of the rooms. Private latrines have also been discovered in the eastern building, which suggest that it belonged to a higher-status residence within the complex.

==== Salón Rico (Reception Hall of Abd ar-Rahman III) ====
Floor plan of the Salón Rico

The Reception Hall of Abd ar-Rahman III, known by its Spanish name as the Salón Rico ("Rich Hall"), is the most richly decorated structure discovered at Madinat al-Zahra. It was part of a larger palace complex which was built to the south of the Upper Basilical Hall. Its construction has been dated to between 953 and 957, thanks to several inscriptions found in its decoration. The supervisor of the hall's construction was Abdallah ibn Badr, the vizier and highest-ranking official under the caliph at that time. The decoration was executed under the supervision of the caliph's eunuch servant Shunaif, although it's unclear if he was also involved in the design of the hall. It was excavated by Rafael Castejón and Félix Hernández Giménez in 1946 and has since been reconstructed. The hall was fronted by the Upper Garden and by a large water basin, with which it formed a unified design.

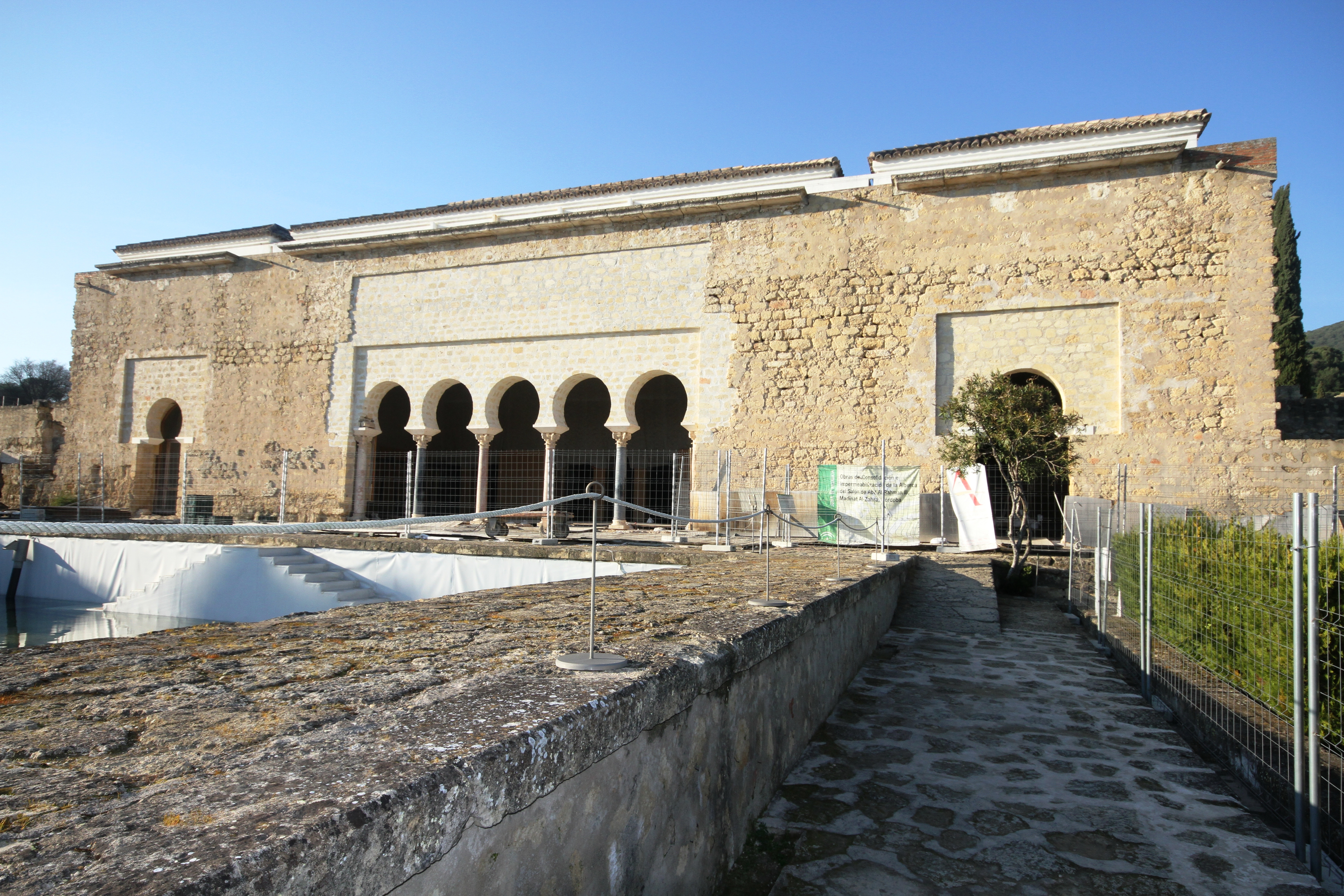
Façade of the reconstructed Salón Rico (2013)

The Salón Rico faced south across the gardens and stood on a platform that was elevated above the adjoining walkways. It was accessed via ramps on either side. The building's front façade features an arcade of five arches which was aligned with the water basin in front. The building's interior has a basilical form with some general similarities to the Upper Basilical Hall. Behind the front arcade is a transversal entrance hall, which in turn leads to the central hall. The central hall is 17.5 meters long and 20.4 meters wide and is divided into three naves by two arcades of six horseshoe arches resting on slender columns. The two side naves are 5.9 meters wide while the central nave is slightly wider at 6.5 meters. Each nave can be accessed from the entrance hall at the front through arcades of two or three arches. The back wall is marked with three decorative blind arches. This central hall is flanked on either side by a square chamber and a rectangular chamber, which were separated from the central hall by solid walls pierced by a single door. Two other doors on either side were later blocked up and turned into decorative niches. The entrance hall to the south is also flanked by square chambers on either side. The building today is covered by sloped wooden roofs built by Félix Hernández Giménez, but it is not known exactly what kind of roofing or ceiling it originally had.

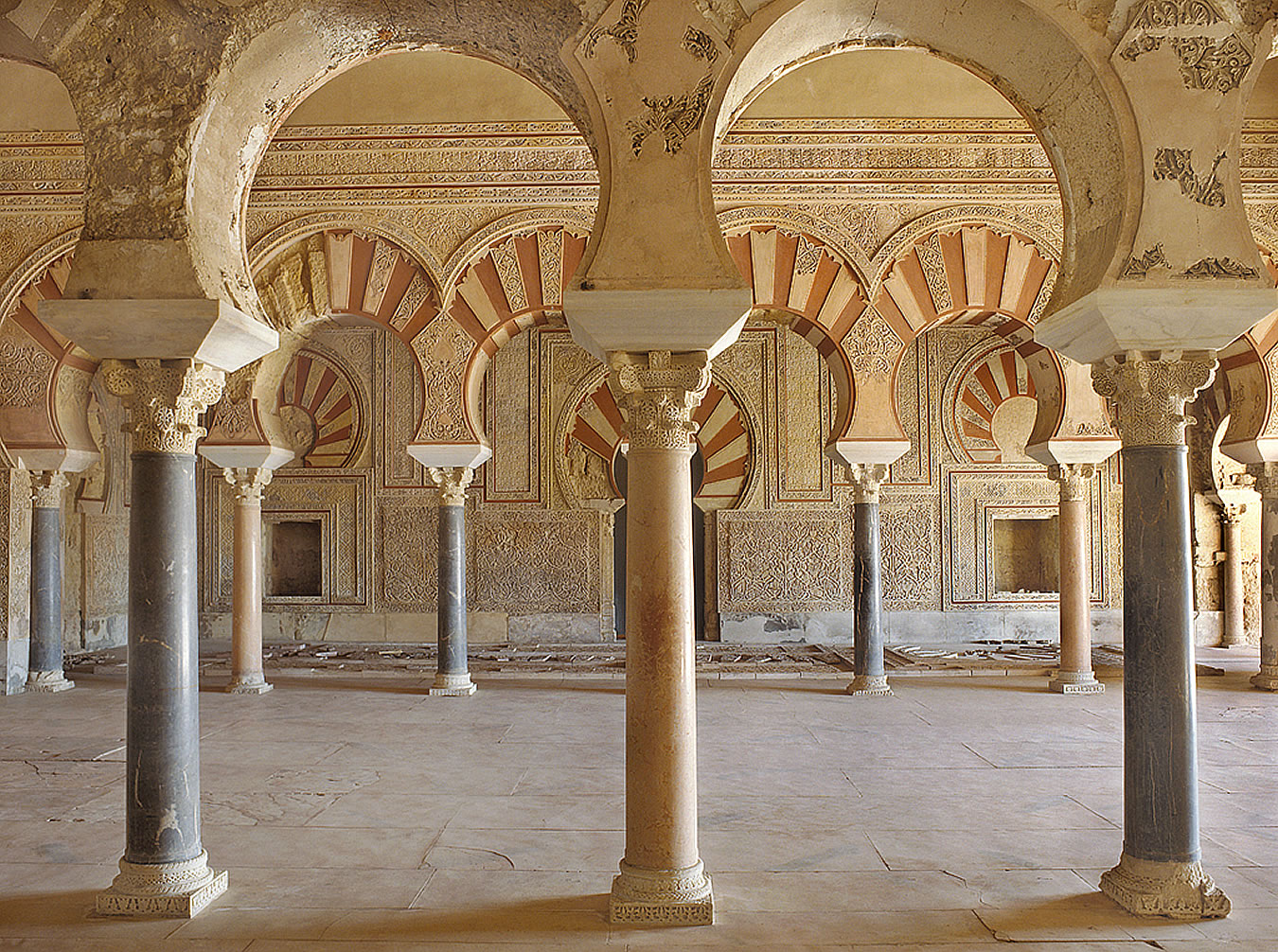
The central hall and its decorated arches

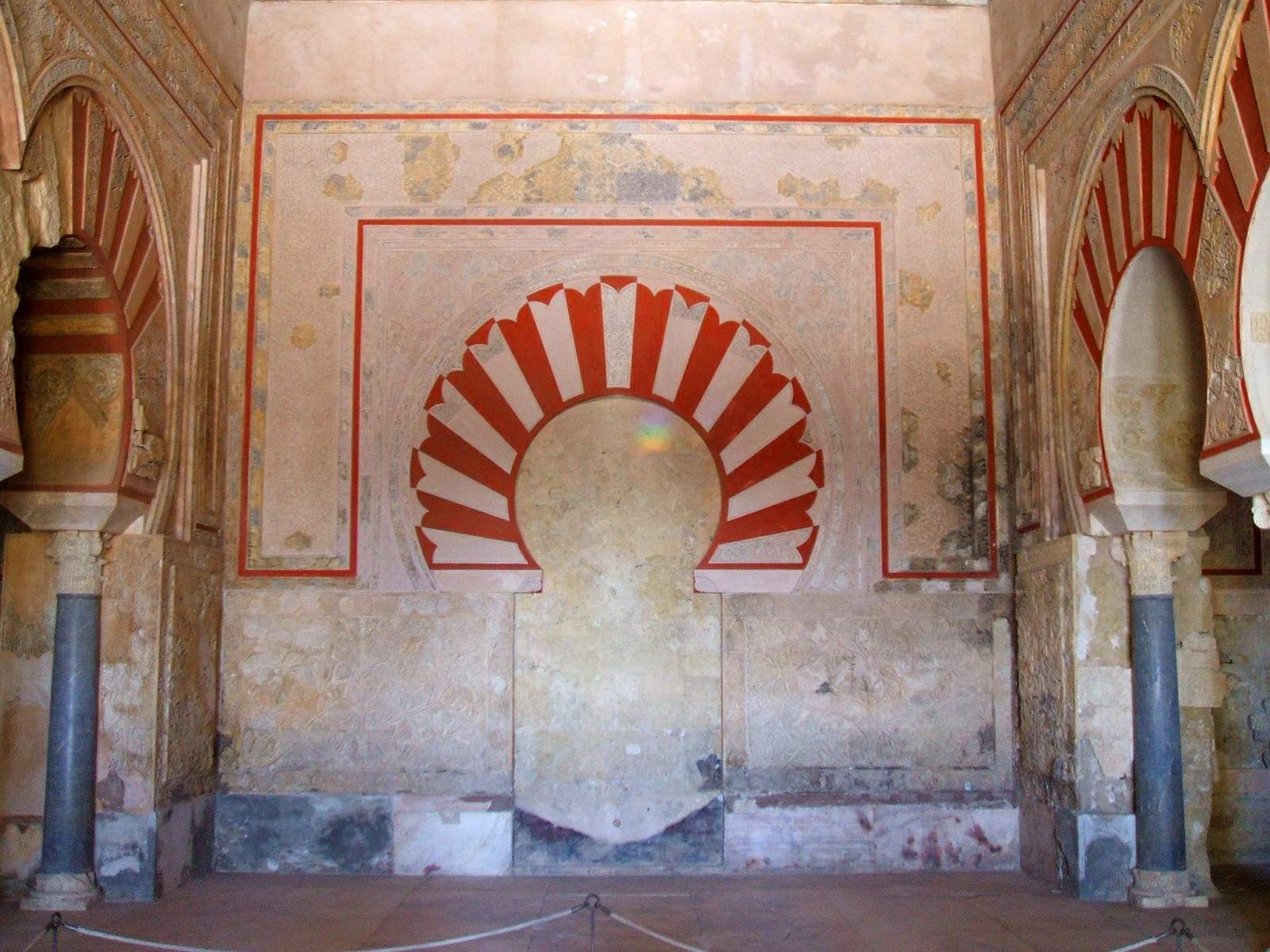
The central blind arch at the back of the hall, where the caliph sat

During audiences the caliph sat at the middle of the back wall, in front of the central blind arch. He would have sat on a divan while his brothers and highest officials stood or sat on either side. Other court officials would have been lined up along the arcades on either side of the central hall. The dimensions of the central hall conform to that of an equilateral triangle whose summit is placed at the center of the back wall and whose base corresponds to the total width of the hall. Felix Arnold notes that these proportions are frequently used in Islamic architecture and are also found in the audience hall of one of the Fatimid palaces in Mahdia. These proportions had the practical benefit of allowing the caliph sitting at the back of the hall to be able to see the entire width of the hall within his field of vision without having to turn his head.

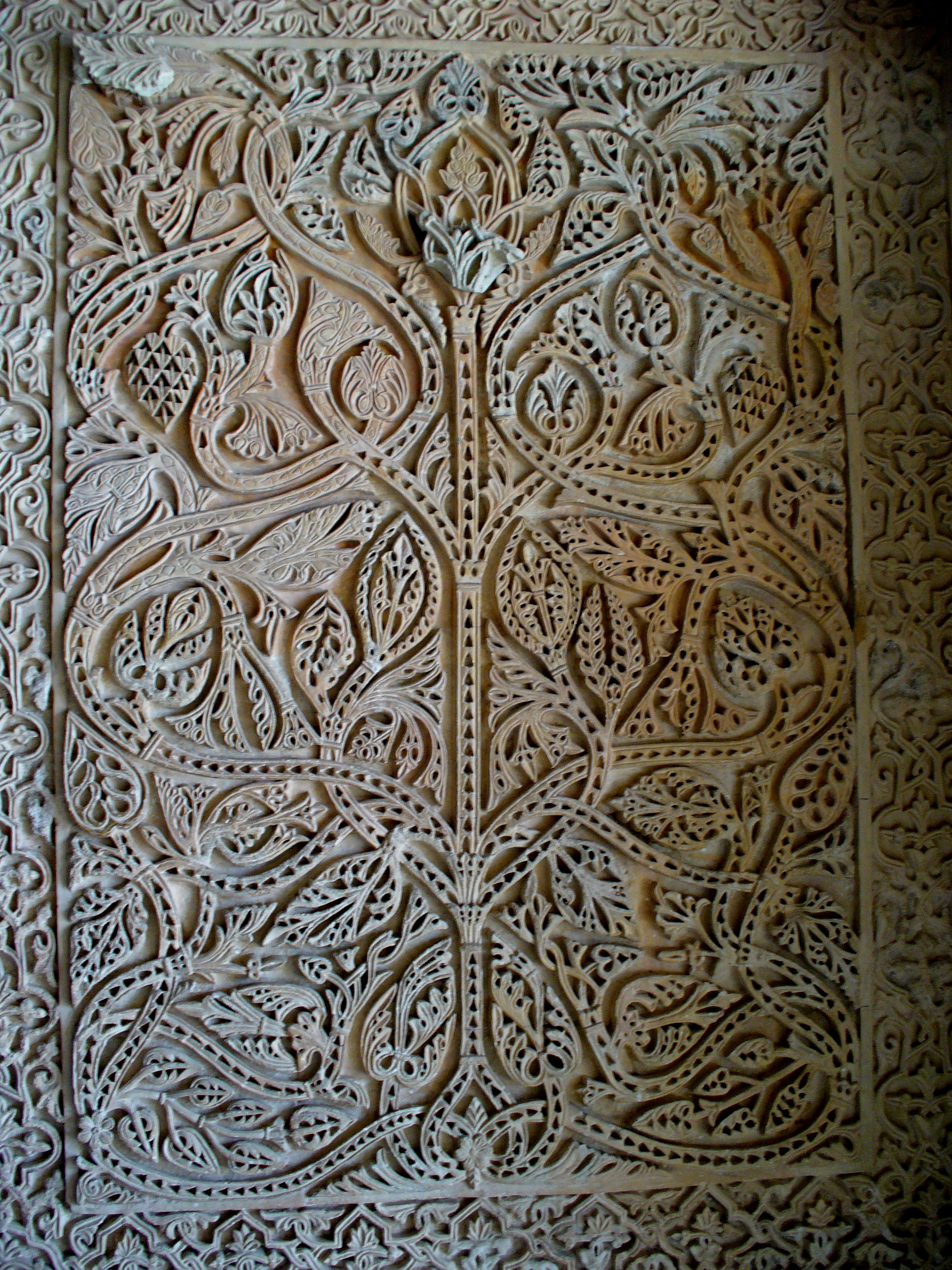
Carved stone panel in the Salón Rico with a "tree of life" motif

The central hall is notable for its outstanding ornamentation, which is carved onto stone panels or slabs attached to the surfaces of walls. As a result of this technique, the stone used for the decoration does not correspond to the stone used for the structure of the building itself, which Antonio Vallejo Triano notes is an innovation that treats the carved stone panels like a "skin" for the hall. The carved panels are mostly made of limestone, while the columns are marble and the floor is paved in marble. The ornamentation is generally divided into three zones: the lower parts of the walls are covered with large panels; the middle zone is occupied primarily by the arches of the arcades, which have voussoirs of alternating colours and motifs, framed by a decorated alfiz; and the upper areas of the walls are covered by horizontal friezes that run just below the ceiling. In general, the motifs are predominantly vegetal arabesques. The larger lower panels frequently feature elaborate representations of the tree of life, which may draw on models from Abbasid art in the east while adapting them to local Andalusi styles.

On either side of the Salón Rico was a long line of various buildings that ran along the northern edge of the Upper and Lower Gardens. Beneath the buildings on the west side was an underground passage, known today as the Camino de Ronda, which may have served as the substructure for the buildings above and which linked the Salón Rico with the Lower Garden. The structures to the east of the Salón Rico included a large bath complex.

==== The Upper Garden and the Central Pavilion ====
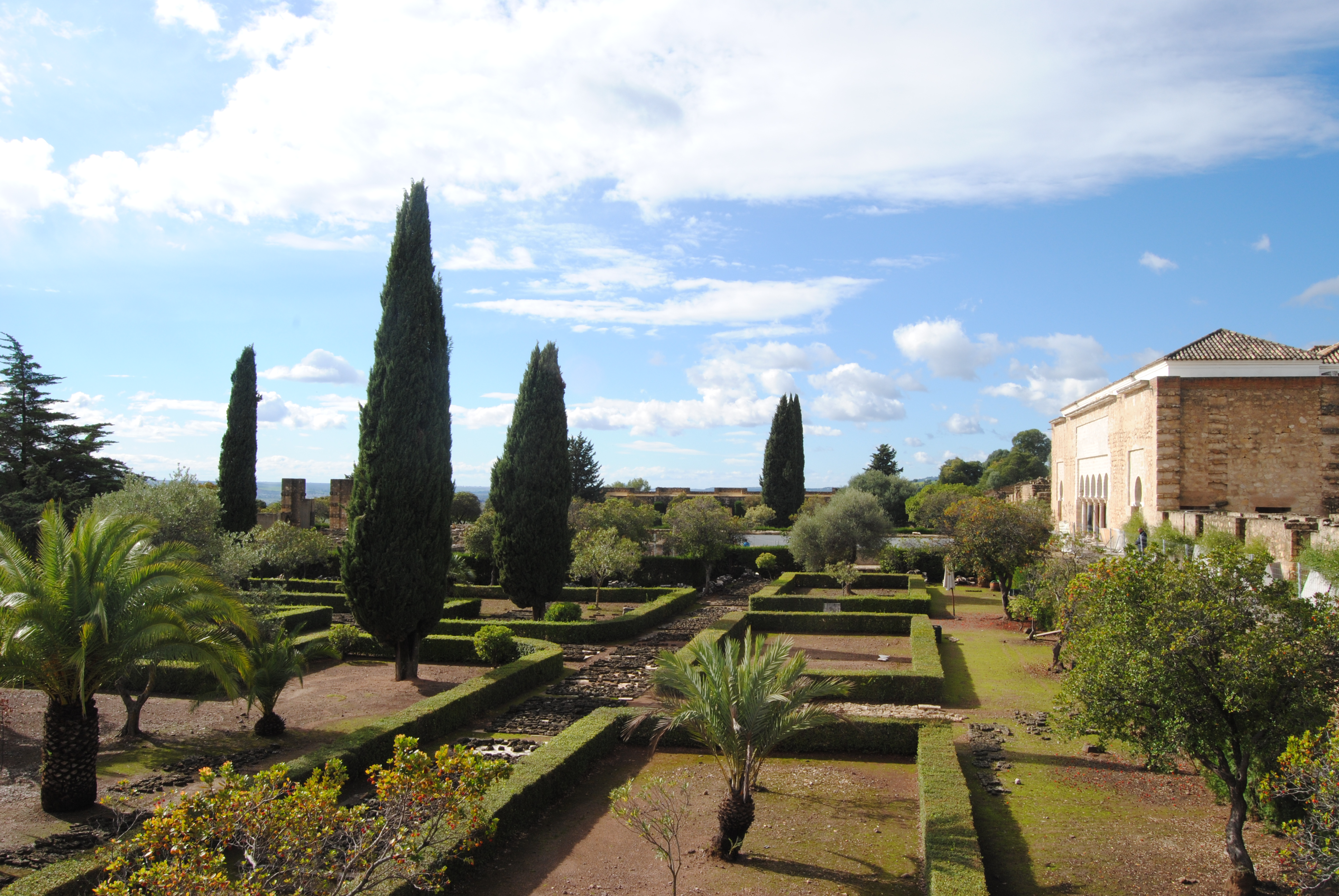
The Upper Garden in front of the Salón Rico (the current trees and shrubs were planted in modern times)

The Upper Garden (Jardín Alto in Spanish) stretches out in front of the Salón Rico and occupies an elevated terrace that is 10 meters higher than the surrounding areas on the east, south, and west. The terrace is artificial, though the builders probably used an existing spur of the hills to start. Its walls are reinforced with rectangular buttresses at regular intervals. On its east side was the Lower Garden and on its west side was the congregational mosque. The latter was reached via a covered path along the terrace wall, and to the south is another large unexcavated garden. The eastern wall of the terrace is aligned with the portico of Bab al-Sudda while its north and south borders are aligned with those of the older Lower Garden to the east. Although it may have been initially intended to have a perfectly square layout, which would have measured 133 by 133 meters, the western side of the garden was extended on top of the Lower Garden, giving it a final width of 153.5 meters instead. The final width corresponds to the base of an equilateral triangle whose summit could be placed at the center of the Salón Rico's façade, similar to the proportions found inside the caliph's reception hall. Felix Arnold suggests that these dimensions are therefore a deliberate part of the design.

The garden itself was for purely aesthetic purposes. Along with the Lower Garden, it is among the earliest examples of the traditional four-part Islamic garden, also known as chahar bagh in the Persian tradition. Around its edge ran a walkway 4 meters wide. Two other walkways split the garden into four quadrants of slightly unequal size (the northern ones being larger). This evidence suggests that the original garden was divided into perfectly equal quadrants but that the east-west path was moved south to its current position in order to accommodate the creation of the Central Pavilion. This change would also explain why the east-west path of the garden is not aligned with the east-west path of the Lower Garden to the east or with the location of a possible pavilion on that side of the garden. The gardens were sunken about 50 to 70 centimeters below the level of the walkways so that the low-growing plants did not impede views. The area has been replanted in modern times, which has impeded archaeobotanical studies, but there is evidence that herbs and shrubs were originally planted, including: myrtle, lavender, hackberry, oleander, basil, alexanders, jujube, and heather.

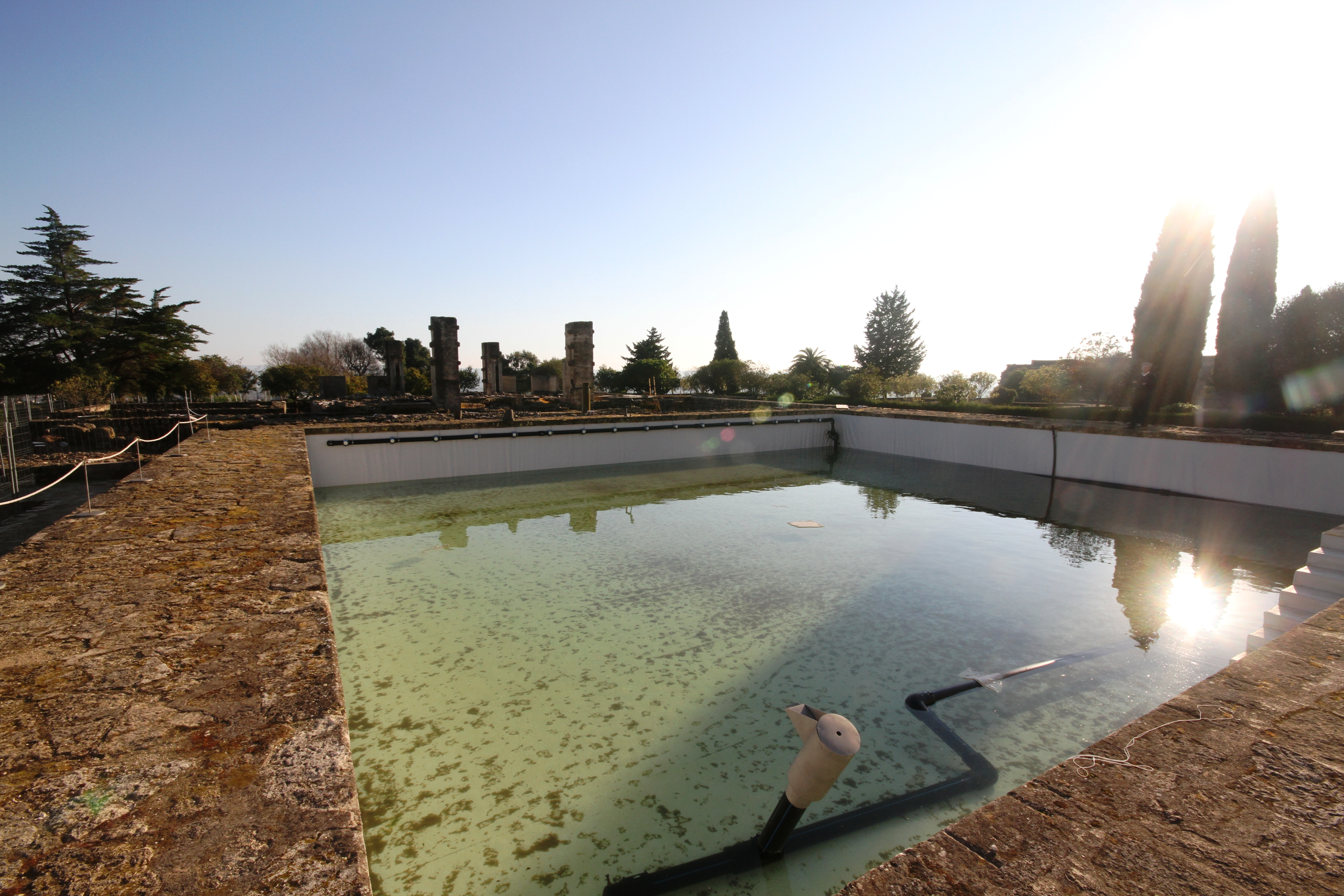
View over the main water basin of the Upper Garden

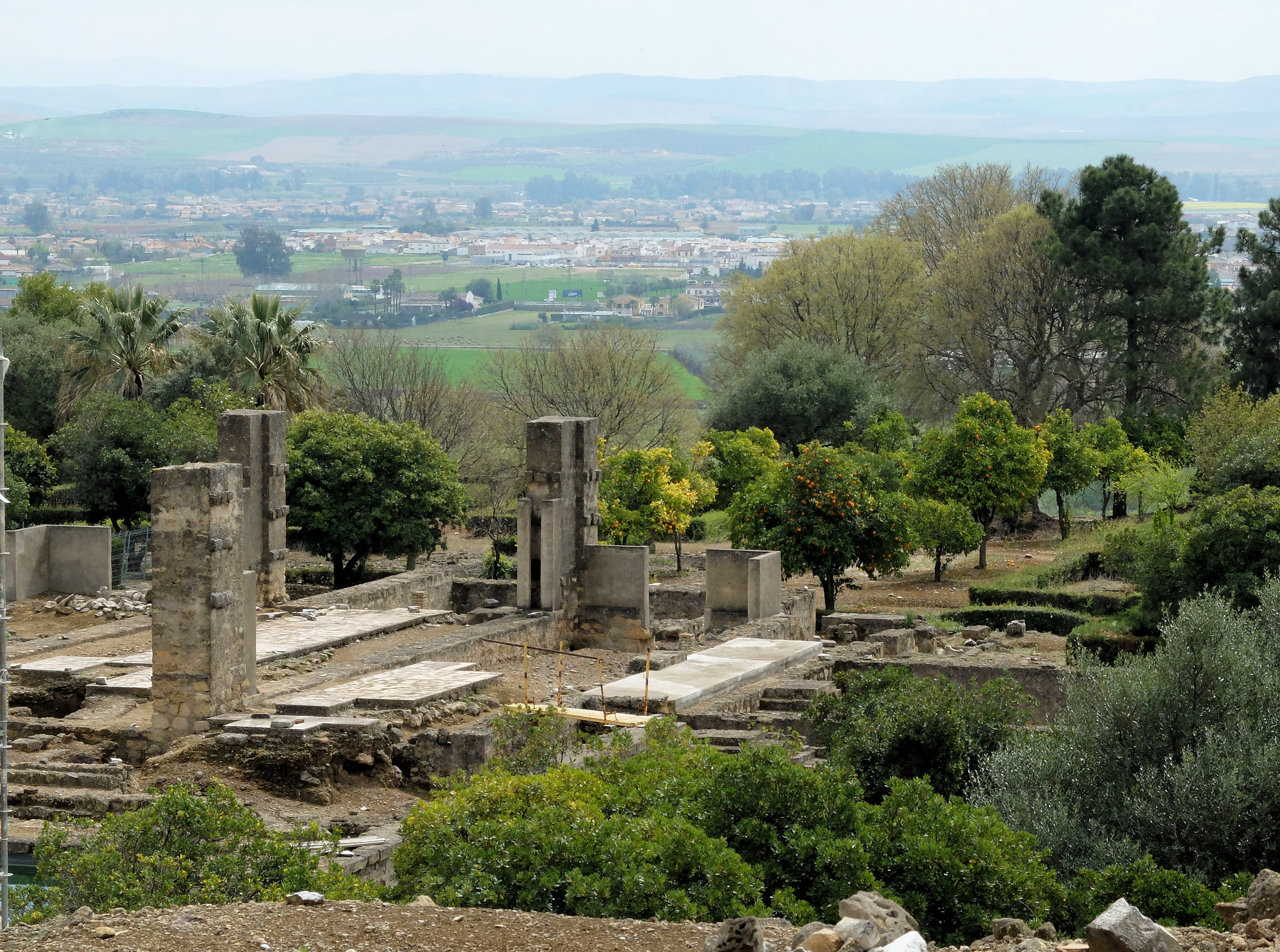
Remains of the Central Pavilion in the Upper Garden

At the middle of the garden's northern side is a large water basin measuring 19 by 19 meters and 2 meters deep. The gardens slope gently from north to south so that this water basin could be used to irrigate them. Water channels ran along the walkways to distribute water. To the south of this basin, near the middle of the gardens, was the large "Central Pavilion" whose construction has been dated to 956 or 957. Very little of its remains have been preserved in comparison to other structures like the Salón Rico and as a result it is still being investigated (as of 2018). It consisted of a rectangular building divided into three naves or parallel halls, aligned roughly north-to-south, with its main entrance facing the Salón Rico. The building stood on a platform one meter higher than the surrounding walkways, and on all four sides was a small water basin which rose to the same height as the platform. The water basins may have been designed and placed so that any observer looking out from inside the pavilion would have seen the reflection of the sky in the water, while an observer from outside would have seen the pavilion reflected in the water. Likewise, the placement of the pavilion in relation to the Salón Rico meant that both buildings would have been reflected in the larger northern water basin. These pools of water would have also reflected light into both buildings through their front archways. They might also have given the impression to observers inside them, when looking out, that the buildings were "floating" on water, since every main entrance was fronted by water.

==== The Lower Garden ====
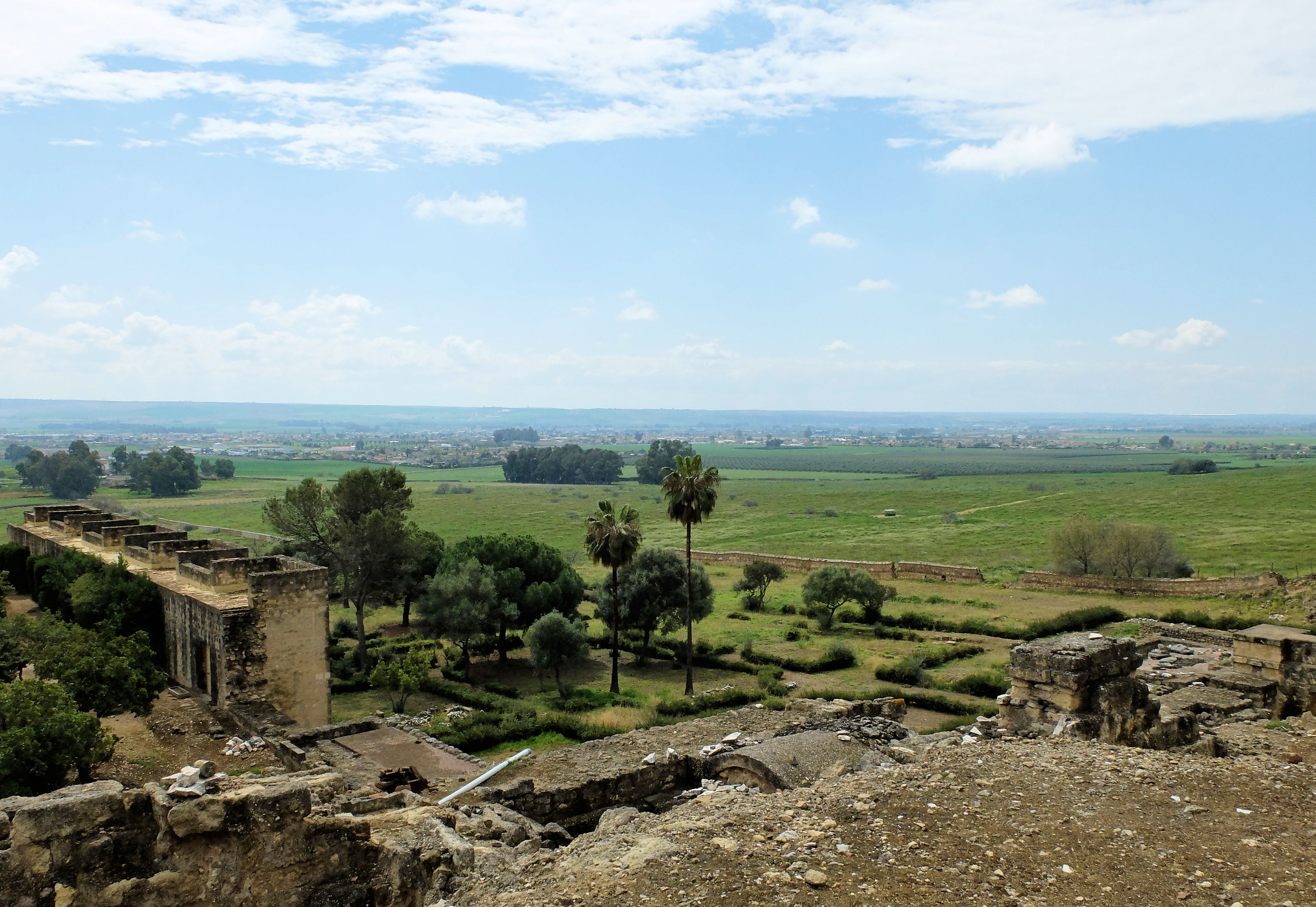
View of the Lower Garden from a nearby terrace

The Lower Garden (Jardin Bajo in Spanish) stood on a lower level on the east side of the Upper Garden and south of the Dar al-Mulk. It has not been completely excavated but it is known to have had an equal four-part division much like the Upper Garden's initial design. It was one of the largest in the city and was probably created during the first phase of construction at Madinat al-Zahra, shortly after its foundation. The garden was originally 125 meters long from north to south and 180 meters wide from east to west, but when the Upper Garden was built to the east its width was reduced by 22 meters. It was surrounded by a walkway 4 meters wide, and two more walkways intersected in the middle of the gardens. The gardens in between the walkways were sunken, as with other examples in the city. It is not clear what they were planted with, but limited evidence suggests once again that they were planted with herbs and shrubs similar to those of the Upper Garden, as well as flax.

At the middle of the garden's eastern edge, along the wall of the Upper Garden, was a rectangular buttress that is much larger than the other buttresses along the Upper Garden wall. At the base of this buttress was a water basin into which water from the Upper Garden probably cascaded from above. A pavilion may have also existed on top of it, with views over the Lower Garden from above, but not enough remains have been preserved to prove this.

=== Water infrastructure ===
The palace was built where the 1st century Roman aqueduct running from the Sierra Morena to Córdoba ran, but this was several metres below the palace, so a new spur was constructed further back to bring permanent running water to the higher levels. In turn, the section of the old Roman aqueduct now diverted was used as a main sewer for a highly complex system of small channels carrying away rain and waste water. Many food and ceramic remains have been found here. In addition to the aqueducts, several new bridges were built (of which two survive today) in order to serve the new roads between the new palace-city and Córdoba.

== Architectural influence and legacy ==
Artistically, Madinat al-Zahra played a great role in formulating a distinct Andalusi Islamic architecture (also referred to as Moorish architecture), as well as establishing a more particular "caliphal" style of the 10th century. The congregational mosque of Madinat al-Zahra bears close resemblance to the Great Mosque of Córdoba (at least prior to the latter's expansion by Al-Hakam II), and replicated its rows of two-tiered arches. The horseshoe arch, which had also appeared in the Great Mosque of Córdoba already, became further ubiquitous in Madinat al-Zahra and consolidated its distinctive form: the arch consisted of about three quarters of a circle and was usually contained within a rectangular frame known as an alfiz. The extensive arabesque decoration, carved in relief across many wall surfaces, demonstrates historic influences from Sassanian and Abbasid Iraq, but also notable differences in its details. The basilical royal reception hall, as seen in the Salón Rico, is another novel creation which became a distinctive feature of palace architecture in this region, as it contrasted with the domed and vaulted halls found in the eastern part of the Islamic world.

The Lower Garden and Upper Garden of Madinat al-Zahra are the earliest archeologically-attested examples of a symmetrically-divided garden in the western Islamic world, and among the earliest examples in the Islamic world more generally. They are also the earliest example in the region to combine such gardens with a system of terraces. This type of garden probably drew its origins from Persian gardens (chahar bagh) that existed far to the east and were imported to the west by Umayyad patrons. Among other things, this eastern Umayyad origin is evidenced by the existence of similar gardens discovered at the palace-villa in Syria known as ar-Rusafa, which belonged to the reign of Hisham ibn Abd al-Malik (early 8th century). Another villa known as al-Qasr ar-Rusafa, built by Abd ar-Rahman I near Córdoba in 777, has not been fully studied but probably also featured gardens and pavilions with elevated views. This suggests that there were precedents for this tradition among the Umayyad emirs of Al-Andalus. Courtyards with symmetrically-divided gardens, later known as riyads (or riads), would go on to become a typical feature of later Andalusi palaces, including the Alhambra, as well as in Moroccan architecture and beyond.

Madinat al-Zahra served as model for the estate called al-Rummānīya, named after the small al-Rumman river that crossed it (that river still exist today west of Cordoba). This estate was built around 965 or 966 by Durrī the Younger, al-Hakam II's treasurer – who gave it to the caliph in 973 after he, Durrī, somewhat fell out of favour. Al-Rummānīya also stands west of Cordoba, on the same mountain but lower than Madinat al-Zahara and some 3 km away from it, it also had terraces - four instead of three -, and many other features similar to al-Zahara albeit on a smaller scale, covering only 4 ha — but its water system was more advanced than its model and boating parties were held there.

== Archaeology and conservation ==
Archeological excavations on the site began in 1911 under the direction of Spanish architect Ricardo Velázquez Bosco. Work continued under Félix Hernández Giménez between 1923 and 1936 and between 1943 and 1975, then under Rafael Manzano Martos between 1975 and 1982, under Antonio Vallejo Triano between 1985 and 2013, and under José Escudero Aranda since 2013. The Salón Rico, the most richly decorated building, was excavated by Rafael Castejón and Félix Hernández Giménez in 1946. Thanks to the partially preserved walls and many preserved fragments of decoration, it was reconstructed under the supervision of Félix Hernandez Giménez. Restoration of the hall's ornamentation continues today.

Excavation and restoration continues, dependent upon funding by the Spanish government. In 2020, archaeologists discovered a gateway that marked the eastern entrance to the 10th-century palace and which had been missing for more than a thousand years.

The unexcavated portions of the site, which comprise around 90 percent of its total area, are threatened by the illegal construction of housing. According to a report from the New York Times in 2005, the local government in Córdoba was not enforcing a law passed in 1995 that expanded protections for the site against development. As a result, construction companies are putting up houses on these unexcavated areas.

== Museum ==
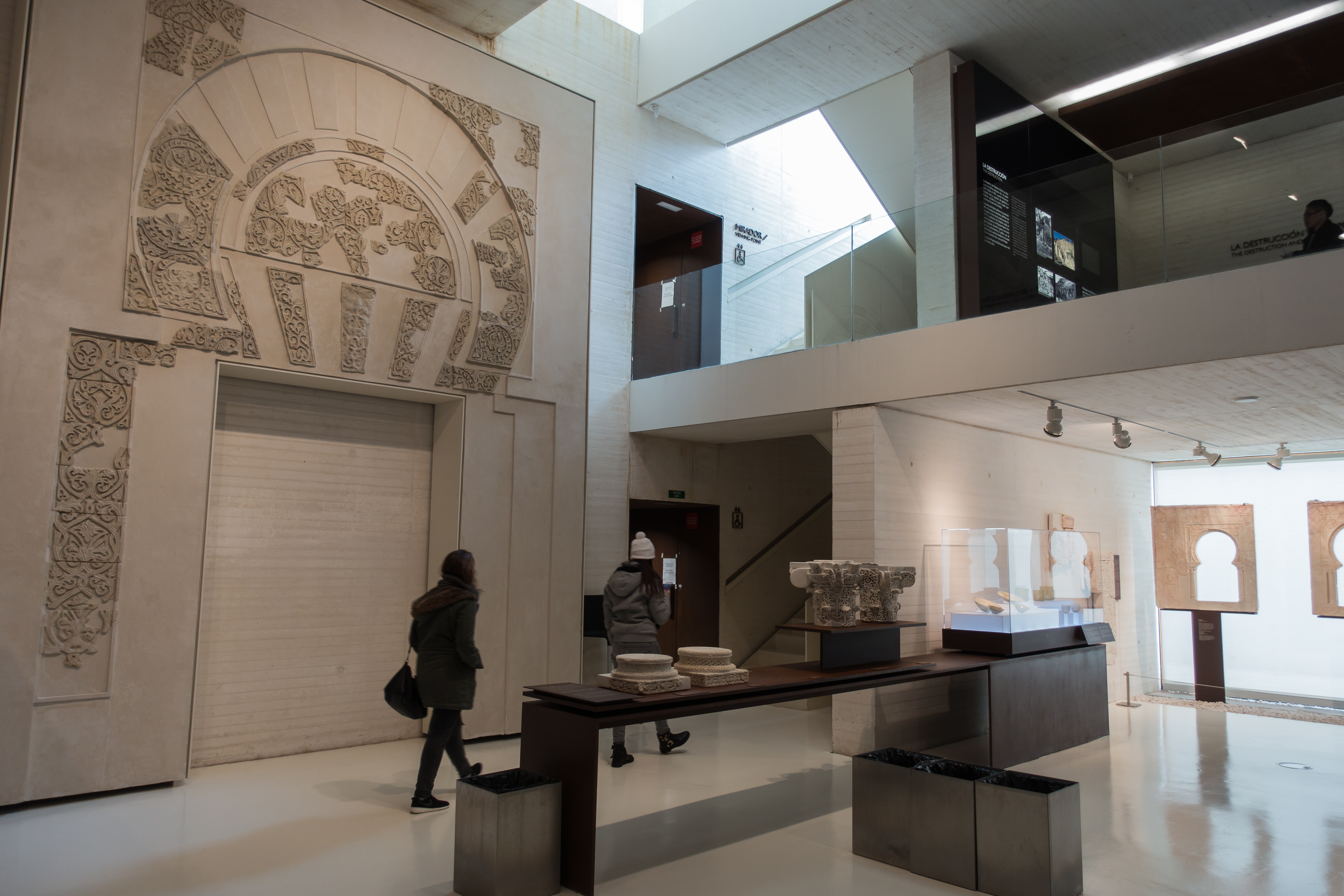
Interior of the museum and its exhibits

A new archeological museum dedicated to Medina Azahara was opened in 2009, located on the edge of the site. The museum building was built low, with much of the space underground, to minimize disruption to the views of the landscape from the ruins. The museum, which was designed by the firm Nieto Sobejano Arquitectos, won the Aga Khan Award for Architecture in 2010.

== See also ==
- Dar al-Wuzara ("Casa de los Visires" or "Casa Militar")

== Bibliography ==
- Arnold, Felix (2017). Islamic Palace Architecture in the Western Mediterranean: A History. Oxford University Press. ISBN 9780190624552.
- Bariani, Laura (2002). "Al-Madîna al-Zâhira según el testimonio de las fuentes árabo-andalusíes". II Congreso Internacional la Ciudad en Al-Andalus y el Magreb (in Spanish). Fundación El legado andalusì. pp. 327–341. ISBN 9788493205171.
- Barrucand, Marianne; Bednorz, Achim (1992). Moorish Architecture in Andalusia. Taschen. ISBN 9783822896327.
- Bloom, Jonathan M. (2020). Architecture of the Islamic West: North Africa and the Iberian Peninsula, 700-1800. Yale University Press. ISBN 9780300218701.
- Catlos, Brian A. (2018). Kingdoms of Faith: A New History of Islamic Spain. New York: Basic Books. ISBN 9780465055876.
- Kennedy, Hugh (1996). Muslim Spain and Portugal: A Political History of al-Andalus. Routledge. ISBN 9781317870418.
- Ruggles, D. Fairchild (1991). "Historiography and the Rediscovery of Madinat al-Zahra'". Islamic Studies. 30 (1/2): 129–140. JSTOR 20840030.
- Ruggles, D. Fairchild (2000). Gardens, Landscape, and Vision in the Palaces of Islamic Spain. University Park, Penn.: The Pennsylvania State University Press. ISBN 9780271042725.
- Ruggles, D. Fairchild (2008). Islamic Gardens and Landscapes. Philadelphia: University of Pennsylvania Press. ISBN 9780812207286.
- Vallejo Triano, Antonio (1992). "Madīnat az-Zahrā': The Triumph of the Islamic State". In Dodds, Jerrilynn D. (ed.). Al-Andalus: The Art of Islamic Spain. New York: The Metropolitan Museum of Art. pp. 27–39. ISBN 0870996371.
- Vallejo Triano, Antonio (2007). "Madinat Al-Zahra; Transformation of a Caliphal City". In Anderson, Glaire D.; Rosser-Owen, Mariam (eds.). Revisiting al-Andalus: perspectives on the material culture of Islamic Iberia and beyond. Brill. pp. 3–26. ISBN 978-90-04-16227-3.
- Vallejo Triano, Antonio (2023). "The Ceremonial Ensemble of the Umayyad Caliphate at Madīnat al-Zahrāʾ". In Monferrer-Sala, Juan Pedro; Monterroso-Checa, Antonio (eds.). A Companion to Late Antique and Medieval Islamic Cordoba: Capital of Roman Baetica and Caliphate of al-Andalus. Brill. pp. 271–303. ISBN 978-90-04-52415-6.
