= Abbadid dynasty =

Arab Muslim dynasty (1023–1091)

The Abbadid dynasty or Abbadids (Arabic: بنو عباد, romanized: Banū ʿAbbād) was an Arab dynasty from the tribe of Banu Lakhm of al-Hirah, which ruled the Taifa of Seville in al-Andalus following the fall of the Caliphate of Cordoba in 1031. After the collapse, they were the most powerful Taifa and before long absorbed most of the others. Abbadid rule lasted from about 1023 until 1091, but during the short period of its existence it exhibited singular energy and typified its time.

== Overview ==
During their reign, the Abbadids also made significant contributions to the development of science, military technology and medicine. Their patronage of scholars and researchers helped to create a culture of learning that encouraged scientific inquiry and experimentation. The Abbadids' interest in science is evident in the many scientific works that were written during their reign, including the famous Book of Optics by the polymath Ibn al-Haytham.

In addition to their patronage of the arts, sciences, and literature, the Abbadids also made significant contributions to the development of Islamic law and jurisprudence. They were known for their fair and just rule, and they encouraged the use of Islamic law to settle disputes and conflicts. This helped to create a stable and peaceful society in Andalusia, which was admired by people throughout the Muslim world.

Despite their many achievements, the Abbadids were eventually overthrown by the Almoravids, who were more conservative and orthodox in their interpretation of Islam. The Almoravids saw the Abbadids' tolerance of other religions and cultures as a threat to the purity of Islam, and they were determined to impose their own strict interpretation of the faith on Andalusia. This led to a period of religious and cultural repression that stifled the creative and intellectual energy of the region.

Despite their eventual downfall, the Abbadids left a lasting legacy in Andalusia. They were known for their love of art and architecture, their patronage of literature and science, and their tolerance of other religions and cultures. Their reign helped to create a rich and diverse society that was admired throughout the Muslim world, and their contributions to Islamic law and jurisprudence helped to create a stable and just society in Andalusia. The Abbadids' legacy continues to be celebrated today as an important period in the history of the Iberian Peninsula.

== History ==
=== Abu al-Qasim Muhammad ibn Abbad (ruled 1023–1042) ===
Abu al-Qasim Muhammad ibn Abbad (r. 1023–1042), the qadi of Seville, founded the house in 1023.

The Abbadids had not previously played a major role in history though they were of noble pedigree from tribe Lakhm in Egypt and were among the first Arab Muslim families to settle in al-Andalus after the Umayyad conquest of Hispania. Abu al-Qasim's father, Isma'il ibn Abbad (died 1023) was named as qadi of Sevilla by the regent Almanzor, and established his family's leading role in the city: the contemporary historian Ibn Hayyan reports that his son owned no less than third of Seville's territory, making him by far the richest man in the city.

Abu al-Qasim gained the confidence of the townsmen by playing a major role in the successful resistance to the Berber soldiers of fortune who had grasped at the fragments of the Caliphate of Cordoba. After the Berbers were forced out, he was, by near unanimous voice of the people and prompting of the merchant and nobles, given the reins of power. Initially, he refused the position, worried of the fatal repercussions that could follow failure or the changing of the voice of the people. At first, he professed to rule only with the advice of a council formed of the nobles.

Abu al-Qasim's first order of business was to rebuild the military of Seville, which had, in recent times, disappeared. This, he accomplished by first creating recruiting posts in all settlements controlled by Seville. The promise of substantial pay along with promises of unrestricted looting brought many able men to him. Second, he opened the ranks to all races and social class, as Berbers, Arabs, Christians, and foreigners were all accepted along with slaves from Nubia and Sudan. Before the military could become a formidable force, a Berber army from Málaga was at the gates demanding entrance and fealty, in the form of sons of the richest and most powerful nobles and merchants as hostages. Abu al-Qasim, to show his people his trust in the situation, offered his own son as solitary collateral. This show of bravery, convinced his population to follow him with near zeal, and at this time dismissed the council and began his solitary rule.

From this point on, he was able to make small inroads into the small principalities surrounding him. This began with an alliance forged with the governor of Carmona. His first conquest was Beja, followed by the plunder and subsequent control of the coastal regions from Cádiz west. The Taifa of Badajoz was next as he defeated and captured the son of the emir, and at this early time nearly defeated the Taifa of Córdoba, beaten back at the end by an alliance Cordoba made with the Berbers.

The Berbers continued to be a thorn in the side of Abu al-Qasim, as they now recognized Yahya as their supreme leader, something that had not been accomplished before. At this time, it was apparent to Abu al-Qasim that a coalition was needed to defeat the growing Berber threat; however it was also apparent that he would not be accepted as the head of this coalition of caliphates. Abu al-Qasim was able to procure an imposter ("Pseudo-Hisham") who resembled the caliph Hisham II. This man, who was a mat-maker by trade, had previously been involved in an unsuccessful attempt at trickery. This time the deception was successful and the coalition formed starting with Cordoba, then followed by Dénia, Balearic Islands, Tortosa, and Valencia. Angered by the growing forces against him, Yahya was lured into an ambush and along with the larger portion of his command killed. When Abu al-Qasim died in 1042 he had created a state which, though weak in itself, appeared strong as compared to its neighbours. He had made his family the recognized leaders of the Andalusian Muslims against the neo-Berber element arrayed under the king of Granada.

=== Abbad II al-Mu'tadid (ruled 1042–1069) ===
Abbad II al-Mu'tadid (1042–1069), the son and successor of Abu al-Qasim, became one of the most remarkable figures in Iberian Muslim history. He had a striking resemblance to the Italian princes of the later Middle Ages and the early Renaissance, of the stamp of Filippo Maria Visconti.

Abbad wrote poetry and loved literature; he also appears as a poisoner, a drinker of wine, a sceptic, and a man treacherous to the utmost degree. Though he waged war all through his reign, he himself very rarely appeared in the field, but directed the generals, whom he never trusted, from his "lair" in the fortified palace, the Alcázar of Seville. He killed with his own hand one of his sons who had rebelled against him. In 1053, he tricked a number of his enemies, the Berber chiefs of southern al-Andalus, into visiting him, and got rid of them by smothering them in the hot room of a bath. He then seized their kingdoms of Arcos, Moron, and Ronda. He also forcibly annexed the kingdoms of Mertola, Niebla, Huelva and Saltes, Santa Maria do Algarve, and Silves.

He habitually preserved the skulls of the enemies he had killed—those of the meaner men to be used as flower-pots, while those of the princes were kept in special chests. He devoted his reign mainly to extending his power at the expense of his smaller neighbours, and in conflicts with his chief rival the king of Granada. These incessant wars weakened the Muslims, to the great advantage of the rising power of the Christian kings of León and Castile, but they gave the kingdom of Seville a certain superiority over the other little states. After 1063 he was assailed by Fernando El Magno of Castile and León, who marched to the gates of Seville, and forced him to pay tribute. This fealty was so complete, for the remaining two years of Fernando's reign, that Abbad even surrendered the remains of St. Isidore.

=== Muhammad al-Mu'tamid (ruled 1069–1095) ===
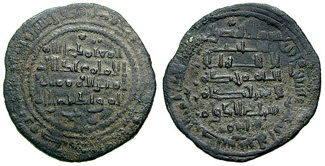
Coin minted during the reign of al-Mutamid

The son of Abbad II, Muhammad al-Mu'tamid (1069–1095) — who reigned under the title al-Mu'tamid — was the third and last of the Abbadids. No less remarkable than his father, and more amiable, he also wrote poetry and favoured poets. Al-Mu'tamid went, however, considerably further in patronage of literature than his father, for he chose as his favourite and prime minister the poet Ibn Ammar. In the end the vanity and folly of Ibn Ammar drove his master to kill him.

Al-Mu'tamid was even more influenced by his favourite wife, al-Rumaikiyya, than by his vizier. He had met her paddling in the Guadalquivir, purchased her from her master, and made her his wife. The caprices of Romaica, and the lavish extravagance of Abbad III in his efforts to please her, form the subject of many stories; a brief tale of the queen appears in the book 'Libro de los ejemplos del Conde Lucanor y de Patronio (Book of the examples of Count Lucanor and Patronio), as the tale XXX, De lo que aconteció al rey Abenabed de Sevilla con su mujer, Ramaiquía (Of What Happened to King Abenabed of Seville with his Wife, Ramaiquía). On the other hand, the stories about Ibn Ammar and Rumaiqiyya that appear in much later western works probably describe imaginary events.

In 1071, al-Mu'tamid took control of Cordoba. This was a weak period of control as he had to re-assert control in 1078 and then lost it permanently in 1081. During this period his vizier Ibn Ammar captured Murcia. This period marked the beginning of the end for the Abbadid dynasty, as the following years saw them growing weaker and weaker due to a number of events: first came the start of hostilities with Alfonso VI, followed by the Christians succeeding in Aragon, Valencia, and Toledo; finally, domestic Muslims created issues at home. When Alfonso VI, from Castile, took Toledo in 1085, Al-Mu'tamid called in Yusuf ibn Tashfin, the Berber Almoravid ruler. He had foreseen the probability that the Almoravids might overthrow him; nevertheless, he chose to ally with them. When his son, Rashid, advised him not to call on Yusuf ibn Tashfin, Al-Mu'tamid rebuffed him and famously said,

I have no desire to be branded by my descendants as the man who delivered al-Andalus as prey to the infidels. I am loath to have my name cursed in every Muslim pulpit. And, for my part, I would rather be a camel-driver in Africa than a swineherd in Castile.

With the assistance of the Almoravids, they were able to defeat Alfonso in 1086. During the six years which preceded his deposition in 1091, Abbasid behaved with valour on the field, but was politically inept and cruel. At the end what he had foreseen happened to him: in 1095 his kingdom was overthrown by Yusuf ibn Tashfin and Almoravid sympathizers within his city, following which he was deposed. He was exiled to Morocco

Al-Mu'tamid was the father-in-law, through his son, Fath al-Mamun (d. 1091), of Zaida, mistress, and possibly wife, of Alfonso VI of Castile. She is said by Iberian Muslim sources to have been the daughter-in-law of Al Mutamid, the Muslim King of Seville, wife of his son Abu al Fatah al Ma'Mun, Emir of Cordoba, (d. 1091). Later Iberian Christian chroniclers call her Al Mutamid's daughter, but the Islamic chroniclers are considered more reliable. With the fall of Seville to the Almoravids, she fled to the protection of Alfonso VI of Castile, becoming his mistress, converting to Christianity and taking the baptismal name of Isabel.

== Works cited ==
- Barton, Simon (2004). Black, Jeremy (ed.). A History of Spain. Palgrave Essential Histories. New York, NY: Palgrave Macmillan. ISBN 0-333-63257-5. LCCN 2003066374.
- Hoiberg, Dale H., ed. (2010). "Abbadies". Encyclopædia Britannica. Vol. I: A-Ak - Bayes (15th ed.). Chicago, Illinois: Encyclopædia Britannica, Inc. ISBN 978-1-59339-837-8.
- Lagassé, Paul, ed. (2000). "Abbadies". The Columbia Encyclopedia (6th ed.). New York, NY: Columbia University Press. ISBN 0-7876-5015-3. LCCN 00-027927.
- Mu'tamid (1915). The poems of Muʹtamid, King of Seville. Translated by Dulcie Lawrence Smith. London, UK. LCCN 82085220.
- Reilly, Bernard F. (1992). The Contest of Christian and Muslim Spain: 1031-1157. Cambridge, MA: Blackwell. ISBN 0-6311-6913-X. LCCN 91017670.
- Scott, S. P. (1977) [1904]. History of the Moorish Empire in Europe. Vol. II (Reprint ed.). New York, NY: AMS Press. ISBN 0-404-09672-7.
- Soravia, Bruna (2011). "ʿAbbādids (search results)". In Fleet, Kate; Krämer, Gudrun; Matringe, Denis; Nawas, John; Rowson, Everett (eds.). Encyclopaedia of Islam (3rd ed.). Brill Online. ISSN 1873-9830.
- Stearns, Peter N., ed. (2001). "g. The Iberian Peninsula". The Encyclopedia of World History: Ancient, Medieval, and Modern Chronologically Arranged (6th ed.). Boston, MA: Houghton Mifflin Company. ISBN 0-395-65237-5. LCCN 2001024479.
- Bennison, A.K. The Almoravid and Almohad Empires. Edinburgh University Press, 2016.
- Kennedy, Hugh. Muslim Spain and Portugal: A Political History of al-Andalus. Routledge, 2014.
- Menocal, Maria Rosa. The Ornament of the World: How Muslims, Jews and Christians Created a Culture of Tolerance in Medieval Spain. Little, Brown and Company, 2002.
- Salma Khadra Jayyusi, ed. The Legacy of Muslim Spain. Leiden: E.J. Brill, 1994.
- Wasserstein, David J. The Rise and Fall of the Party-Kings: Politics and Society in Islamic Spain, 1002-1086. Princeton University Press, 1985.
