= List of pre-modern states =

This article lists the many extinct states, countries, nations, empires or territories from Ancient History to just before the Early Modern period, grouped geographically. For the purposes of this list, the Early Modern period begins at the Fall of Constantinople in 1453. For earlier civilizations, see prehistory.

== Europe, North Africa and the Near East ==
=== Ancient ===
- Achaean League (280–146 BCE)
- Adiabene (15–116 CE)
- Aetolian League (367–189 BCE)
- Akkadian Empire
- Alamanni
- Ammon (10th century BCE-332 BCE)
- Kingdom of Hatra
- Kingdom of Armenia
- Assyria
  - Neo-Assyrian Empire
- Atropatene
- Attalid kingdom
- Avar Kingdom
- Axumite Kingdom
- Babylonia
  - Neo-Babylonian Empire
- Bithynia
- Bosporan Kingdom
- Kingdoms of Sub-Roman Britain
- Burgundian Kingdom
- Cappadocia
- Caucasian Iberia
- Carthage
- Chaldea
- Characene
- Commagene
- Colchis
- Cyrene
- Dacia
- Delian League (Athenian Empire, 478 BC-404 BC)
- Edom
- Egrisi
- Egyptian Empire
- Elam
- Elymais
- Ancient Epirus
- Etruria
- Fatimid Caliphate
- Finnveden
- Kingdom of the Franks
- Frisian kingdom
- Galatia
- Gallic Empire
- Gepid Kingdom
- Ghassanid Kingdom
- Gordyene
- Greco-Bactrian Kingdom
- Hellenic city-states (such as Athens, Sparta, Syracuse) and their allied cities/colonies/territories. See List of ancient Greek cities for all Greek Poleis.
- Hellenistic Empires (Ptolemaic, Seleucid, Antigonid, etc.)
- Himyar
- Hittites
- Hunnic Empire
- Hurrians
- Illyria
- Hebrew kingdoms of Israel and Judah, and later kingdom of Judaea
- Kindah
- Kush
- Lakhmids
- Lombard Kingdoms
- Lycia
- Lydia
- Macedon
- Mauritania
- Media
- Meroe
- Moab
- Nabataean kingdom
- Nekor
- Njudung
- The petty kingdoms of present-day Norway
- Nubia
- Numidian Kingdom
- Saxons
- Odrysian kingdom of Thrace
- Osroene
- Ostrogothic Kingdom
- Palmyra
- Parthia
- Philistines
- Phoenician city states
- Pontus
- Rome
  - Roman Kingdom
  - Roman Republic
  - Roman Empire
- Rugiland
- Scythia
- Domain of Soissons
- Suebic Kingdom
- Sumerian city states
- Tartessos
- Thuringia
- Urartu
- Värend
- Vasconia
- Visigothic Kingdom
- Yamkhad
- Yemeni Kingdoms
  - Qataban
  - Hadramaut
  - Sabaeans
  - Minaeans
- Troy

There were also numerous Celtic, Germanic, and Slavic Tribes.

=== Medieval ===
==== England ====
After the collapse of the Roman Empire, the Romano-British territories became increasingly fragmented. This was a result of the traditional system of Celtic inheritance: the realm was split amongst all sons upon a king's death. This situation was made worse after c. 449 when Jutes and Anglo-Saxons began colonising the south-eastern seaboards. As Jutes and Anglo-Saxons drove further inland, remaining Celts fled to the far corners of the island. Eventually the Romano-Britons (now known to the Anglo-Saxons as "Welsh") were assimilated or driven into the highlands of Cambria (Wales) or Caledonia (Scotland).

Sub-Roman Brythonic kingdoms in England

- Dumnonia, a realm named after the Dumnonii in the southwest.
  - Kingdom of Cornwall, ca. 720–870, rump state after the fall of Dumnonia to Wessex.
- Bryneich, a hypothesised kingdom in the modern-day northeast of England. The region is also thought to have been a part of Gododdin.
- Ebrauc, a small kingdom centred on York.
- Calchfynedd, a kingdom in the Chiltern or Cheviot Hills.
- Elmet, a substantial kingdom near Leeds extinguished in 616.
- Rheged, another substantial kingdom, divided into north and south, in the northwest of modern England.
- Pengwern, a significant kingdom in what is now Shropshire.

Anglo-Saxon kingdoms in England

- Northumbria, formed out of the two northern Anglian kingdoms:
  - Beornice or Bernicia, a small kingdom comprising the northern part of Northumbria.
  - Dere or Deira, a small kingdom comprising the southern part of Northumbria.
- Mercia, which absorbed the smaller kingdoms of Lindsey and Hwicce.
- East Anglia.
- Kent.
- Sussex, kingdom of the South Saxons.
- Wessex, kingdom of the West Saxons.
- Essex, kingdom of the East Saxons.
- Haestingas, a Saxon tribe in part of Sussex.
- Magonsaete, an Anglian tribe in the hills of Shropshire.
- Hwicce, an Anglian tribe in modern Gloucestershire and Worcestershire.
- Middle Saxons, a Saxon tribe in modern Middlesex and Hertfordshire.
- Suthrege, the Saxons of modern Surrey.
- Hicca, a small Middle Angle tribe in modern Cambridgeshire.
- Wreoconsaete, an Anglian tribe in the hills of Shropshire.
- Gyre, a small Middle Angle tribe in modern Cambridgeshire.
- Wihtwara, the Jutes of the Isle of Wight.

Kingdom of England

==== Wales ====
Sub-Roman and Medieval Brythonic kingdoms in Wales Wales experienced a similar history during this time, although the Welsh population successfully resisted the influx of Anglo-Saxon settlers into the British Isles. The country was home to a number of princedoms until England's ultimate conquest of the region in the later medieval period.

- Kingdom of Gwynedd, a kingdom that eventually became the core of the Principality of Wales
- Dyfed
- Deheubarth
- Powys
- Brycheiniog, became modern Brecknockshire
- Ceredigion
- Gwent
- Morgannwg, became modern Glamorgan
- Gwrtheyrnion
- Meirionnydd, became modern Merionethshire
- Seisyllwg
- Rhufoniog
- Rhos
- Dogfeiling
- Dunoting
- Maelienydd
- Principality of Wales a feudal confederation of Welsh principalities and a vassal of England between 1267 and 1282.

==== Scotland ====
Sub-Roman Cumbric kingdoms in Scotland

- Valentia, an entity between Hadrians Wall and the Antonine Wall during the period following the departure of the Romans until c. 450.
- Alt Clud (Strathclyde), also known as the "Kingdom of the Rock" referring to the stronghold of Dumbarton Rock in the Firth of Clyde
- Gododdin
- Manau Gododdin

Pictish kingdoms in Scotland

- Cait — situated in modern Caithness and Sutherland
- Ce — situated in modern Mar and Buchan
- Circinn — perhaps situated in modern Angus and the Mearns[37]
- Fib — the modern Fife, known to this day as 'the Kingdom of Fife'
- Fidach — location unknown
- Fotla — modern Atholl (Ath-Fotla)[38]
- Fortriu — cognate with the Verturiones of the Romans; recently shown to be centered around Moray

Gaelic kingdoms in Scotland

- Dál Riata, the proto-state that became Scotland. (this kingdom spanned western Scotland and northeastern Ireland)

Other

- Kingdom of Scotland
- Kingdom of the Isles
- Kingdom of Galloway
- Kingdom of the Rhinns

==== Ireland ====
Extinct kingdoms in Ireland Ireland during the early medieval period consisted of some two hundred tuathas or minor kingdoms, which were in turn vassals of the rulers of an over-kingdom, called a cóiced (usually translated as a portion, a fifth, or a province). The most prominent of these kingdoms were

- Aileach – later Tír Conaill and Tír Eógain
- Airgíalla
- Ulaid
- Mide
- Laighin
- Osraighe
- Munster – including Ormond, Desmond and Thomond
- Uí Maine
- Connacht

Between the 8th and 12th centuries, various Ard Rí attempted unsuccessfully to impose their rule over all the kingdoms in Ireland. Among those whose efforts almost made this a reality were Flann Sinna, reigned 877–916); Niall Glúndub mac Áedo (916–919); Brian Bóruma mac Cennétig (1002–1014); Toirdhealbhach Ua Briain (1055–1086; and Toirdhealbhach Ua Conchobhair (1119–1156). The last of these kingdoms ceased to exist in the early 17th century. Further Irish kingdoms included:

- Aidhne
- Breifne
- Dál Fiatach
- Dál nAraidi
- Dál Riata (this kingdom spanned western Scotland and northeastern Ireland)
- Desmond
- Dublin
- Fir Manach
- Meath
- Moylurg
- Uí Failghe

For further information see Irish kings.

==== France ====
- Frankish Kingdom/Carolingian Empire (~419–843)
  - West Francia, which eventually developed into the Kingdom of France
- Visigothic Kingdom of Tolosa, encompassing southwestern France (418–507)
- Central Francia
  - Kingdom of Lotharingia (855–869)
  - Duchy of Lorraine
- Duchy of Burgundy (880–1482), dynastic pivot – in personal union – of most of the Low Countries and much of eastern and northern France
- Duchy of Brittany (841 to 1532)
- Papal states of
  - Avignon
  - Peñíscola under antipope Benedict XIII
- Republic of St. Tropez (1470–1672)
- Duchy of Normandy – this state technically continues to exist as the Bailiwicks of Jersey and Guernsey, British crown dependencies not a part of the United Kingdom, while the rest was incorporated into France.
- Duchy of Bar

==== Low Countries ====
- in the Low Countries (present Belgium and/or Netherlands, but not Luxembourg)
  - Seventeen Provinces was transformed
  - Batavian Republic
  - Countship of Flanders
  - Duchy of Gelre (roughly Guelders), another claimant to archducal rank
  - Countship of Holland
  - Duchy of Bouillon
  - Countship of Namur
  - Drenthe
  - Prince-bishopric of Liège
  - Duchy of Brabant, claiming the rank of archduchy as premier principality in the former duchy of Lower Lotharingia
  - Countship of Hainaut (its personal union with Holland was not a state as such)
  - Countship of Hoorn
  - Breda
  - Bergen op Zoom
  - Arkel
  - Thorn
  - Montfoort
  - Friesland (Frisia)
  - Groningen
  - Oostergo
  - Westergo
  - Gemert
  - Woerden
  - Prince-bishopric of Utrecht
  - Countship of Zutphen

==== Germany and neighbouring countries ====
- in historic and present-day Germany and neighbouring countries/regions
  - East Francia
    - Holy Roman Empire (843–1806)
      - List of states in the Holy Roman Empire, nearly all of those (largely Kleinstaaterei) were merged into larger states, eventually into modern Germany, Austria, and other large modern states, remarkable exceptions including Liechtenstein and Luxembourg
  - Pomerania ruled by the Dukes of Pomerania (1121–1637)
  - Monastic State of the Teutonic Knights
  - Great Moravia

==== Spain and Portugal ====
- Iberian states
  - Christian Hispania
    - Crown of Aragon (−1716)
      - Aragon (1035–1707)
        - Ribagorza
        - Sobrarbe
      - Principality of Catalonia (1173-1714)
        - Countship of Barcelona (801–1162)
        - Urgell
        - Pallars Sobirà
        - Pallars Jussà
        - Empúries
      - Kingdom of Valencia
      - Kingdom of Majorca
    - Kingdom of Asturias (716–913) afterwards
    - Kingdom of León (913–1037, 1195–1230)
      - Kingdom/County of Galicia
        - Kingdom of Galicia and Portugal
        - County of Portugal (Portucale, in old Portuguese)
        - County of Coimbra
    - Kingdom of Castile (11th century – 1479)
    - Kingdom of Navarre
    - Kingdom of the Suebi (409–585)
    - Visigothic Kingdom (418–711)
    - Vandalic and Alanic kingdoms in Iberia
  - Moorish Al Andalus
    - Caliphate of Córdoba, originally an emirate
    - Taifa kingdoms, mainly emirates
      - Albarracín
      - Algeciras
      - Almería
      - Alpuente
      - Badajoz
      - Baeza
      - Balearic Islands or Mallorca
      - Beja and Évora
      - Carmona
      - Constantina and Hornachuelos
      - Córdoba
      - Denia
      - Granada
      - Guadix and Baza
      - Huelva
      - Jaén
      - Jérica
      - Lisbon
      - Lorca
      - Málaga
      - Menorca
      - Mértola
      - Molina de Segura
      - Morón
      - Murcia
      - Murviedro and Sagunto
      - Niebla
      - Orihuela
      - Purchena
      - Ronda
      - Saltés and Huelva
      - Algarve
      - Santarém
      - Segorbe
      - Segura
      - Seville
      - Silves
      - Tavira
      - Tejada
      - Toledo
      - Tortosa
      - Valencia
      - Zaragoza

==== Italy ====
Main Article:List of historical states of Italy

- in present Italy
- Roman states
  - Roman monarchy (787–525 BC)
  - Roman Republic (525–27 BC)
  - Roman Empire (27 BC-476 AD)
- Post-Roman Kingdom of Italy
  - Republic of Venice (727–1797)
  - Republic of Genoa (~1000–1797)
  - Carantania
  - Duchy of Lucca
  - Duchy of Modena and Reggio
  - Duchy of Parma
  - Kingdom of Sardinia-Piedmont
  - Duchy (first Countship) of Savoy (1416–1714)
  - Kingdoms of Naples and Sicily (1043–1410, 1442–1500, 1735–1816)
  - Kingdom of the Two Sicilies (1816–1860)
  - Tuscany
  - Papal States – partially annexed by the kingdom of Italy in 1860, completely annexed in 1870
  - and many minor city states and feudal principalities
- in present Sicily
  - Etruscan civilization
  - Roman Republic
  - Roman Empire
  - Western Roman Empire
  - Ostrogoths
  - Byzantine Empire
  - Emirate of Cordoba

==== Russia and Ukraine ====
- In and around present-day European Russia and Ukraine:
  - Volga Bulgaria (660–1236)
  - Novgorod Republic
  - Golden Horde – in 1430s into Kazan Khanate, Crimean Khanate, Astrakhan Khanate, Siberia Khanate, Big Horde; Russia finally became independent
  - Khazar Empire (652–1016)
  - Kievan Rus (860 – 12th century)
  - Trubczewsk – Originally a sub-principality under Novhorod-Siversky, Trubchevsk was independent sporadically throughout the Middle Ages, in 1164–1196, 1202–1211, 1212–1240, 1378–1399, and finally in 1462–1503.
  - Grand Duchy of Lithuania (−1795)

==== Balkans ====
Category:Former countries in the Balkans

- Balkan states
  - Principality of Arbër (1190–1255)
  - Republic of Ragusa/Dubrovnik (1358–1808)
  - Medieval Croatian state (~800s–1102)
  - Great Bulgaria (632–660)
  - First Bulgarian Empire (681–1018)
  - Second Bulgarian Empire (1186–1396)
  - Bulgarian Khanate (681–864)
  - Lordship of Zeta
- Byzantine Empire (330–1453)
  - Empire of Nicaea (1204–1261)
  - Empire of Trebizond
  - Despotate of Epirus
  - Despotate of Morea
- European Crusader States (1098–1291)
  - Latin Empire of Constantinople
  - Kingdom of Thessalonica
  - Principality of Achaea
  - Duchy of Athens
  - Duchy of the Archipelago
- Serbian Principality (7th century-c. 960)
- Grand Principality of Duklja (1043–1101)
- Serbian Grand Principality (1101–1217)
- Serbian Kingdom (1217–1345),
- Serbian Empire (1345–1371),

==== Middle East ====
- Sultanate of Rum (1077–1307)
- Armenian Kingdom of Cilicia (1080–1375)
- Crusader States (1098–1291)
  - Countship of Edessa
  - Kingdom of Jerusalem
  - Principality of Antioch
  - Countship of Tripoli
  - Kingdom of Cyprus
- Khwarezmian Empire (1077–1220)
- Mongol Empire established in 1206, split in 1260s, though some of its successor states lasted for a few centuries
- Great Seljuq Empire
- Timurid Empire Persia, Central Asia, and part of India
- Empire of Trebizond (1204–1461)
- Uyunid Emirate (1076–1253)
- Ottoman Empire (1299–1923)

==== Other ====
- Icelandic Commonwealth (930–1262)
- Kingdom of Hungary (1000–1918)
- Kingdom of Poland (1025–1385)

==== Caucuses ====
- Crimean Khanate (1441–1783)
- Dzungar (1634–1757)

==== North Africa ====
- Kingdom of Egypt, (3100-1550BC), Early Dynastic, 1st, 2nd Intermediate, Middle Kingdom periods.
- Egyptian Empire (1550-1069BC), New Kingdom period.
- Kingdom of Egypt (1069-332BC), 3rd Intermediate and Late period.
- Kingdom of Carthage, (814-650BC)
- Carthaginian Empire, (650-146BC)
- Fatimid Caliphate (909–1171) in North Africa
- Sanhaja
- Mauretania 3rd century BC–431 AD, 533–698

== Asia ==
=== South Asia ===
- Indus Valley civilisation (Harappa, Mohenjo Daro (3100–1200 BC)
- Janapadas (c. 1200 – 6th century BC)
- Mahajanapadas (600-300 bc)
- Magadha
- Nanda Empire
- Maurya Empire
- Shunga Empire
- Kanva Empire
- Mahameghavana dynasty
- Kuninda Kingdom
- Indo Scythian Kingdom
- Chera dynasty (c. 5th century BC–1102 AD)
- Pandyan Kingdom
- Chola Empire, which spread to Malaya, Indonesia, Ceylon (300s BC–1279)
- Satavahana Empire
- Indo-Greek Kingdom
- Indo-Parthian Kingdom
- Western Satraps
- Kushan Empire
- Indo-Sassanid Kingdom
- Kalabhras Kingdom
- Gupta Empire
- Pallava dynasty
- Kadamba dynasty
- Western Ganga dynasty
- Vishnukundina
- Huna Kingdom
- Chalukya dynasty
- Harsha
- Eastern Chalukyas
- Pratihara Empire
- Pala Empire
- Rashtrakuta dynasty
- Paramara dynasty
- Yadava Kingdom
- Chaulukya kingdom
- Western Chalukya Empire
- Hoysala Empire
- Sena dynasty
- Eastern Ganga dynasty
- Kakatiya dynasty
- Kalachuri
- Muslim Sultanates
  - Delhi Sultanate
- Ahom Kingdom
- Vijayanagara Empire
- Kingdom of Mysore (1399–1947)
- Madurai
- Thanjavur Nayak kingdom
- Maratha Empire
- Sikh Empire (1799–1849)
- Mughal Empire (1526–1857)

=== China ===
- Shang dynasty
- Zhou dynasty
- Warring States
  - Chu
  - Cai
  - Cao
  - Chen
  - Lu
  - Song
  - Yue
  - Wu
  - Jin
  - Han
  - Zheng
  - Wei
  - Zhao
  - Qi
  - Yan
  - Qin
- Qin dynasty
- Han dynasty
- Three Kingdoms
  - Eastern Wu
  - Cao Wei
  - Shu Han
- Jin dynasty
- Sixteen Kingdoms
  - Cheng Han
  - Former Liang
  - Former Qin
  - Former Yan
  - Han Zhao
  - Later Liang
  - Later Qin
  - Later Yan
  - Later Zhao
  - Northern Liang
  - Northern Yan
  - Southern Liang
  - Southern Yan
  - Western Liang
  - Western Qin
  - Xia
- Southern and Northern dynasties
  - Liu Song
  - Northern Wei
  - Southern Qi
  - Eastern Wei
  - Liang dynasty
  - Western Wei
  - Chen
  - Northern Qi
  - Northern Zhou
- Sui dynasty
- Tang dynasty
- Five Dynasties and Ten Kingdoms
  - Later Liang
  - Later Tang
  - Later Jin
  - Later Han
  - Later Zhou
  - Wu
  - Wuyue
  - Min
  - Chu
  - Southern Han
  - Former Shu
  - Later Shu
  - Jingnan
  - Southern Tang
  - Northern Han
- Song dynasty
- Yuan dynasty
- Ming dynasty
- Qing dynasty

The many Chinese states had an influence on surrounding regions; from the Song dynasty period alone, this includes:

- Liao dynasty (Khitan ethnicity)
- Western Xia (Tangut ethnicity)
- Jin dynasty (Jurchen ethnicity)

A number of now-extinct states formed under Chinese influence along the Silk Road in the Tarim Basin, including:

- Karasahr
- Khotan
- Kucha
- Yarkand

Unsorted:

- Tibetan Empire (7th to the 11th century)
- Nanzhao (737–902)
- Kingdom of Dali (937–1253)
- Guge (c. 900-c. 1650)

=== Korea ===
The early history of Korea was as complex as that of neighbouring China. A number of Korean states existed on the peninsula and reached up into Manchuria before the formation of the modern state of Korea. These included:

- Gojoseon
- Proto Three Kingdoms
  - Buyeo
  - Okjeo
  - Dongye
  - Jin
  - Samhan (Ma, Byeon, Jin)
- Three Kingdoms
  - Goguryeo
  - Baekje
  - Silla
  - Gaya Confederacy
- North South States
  - Balhae
  - Unified Silla
- Later Three Kingdoms
  - Taebong
  - Hubaekje
  - Silla
- Goryeo
- Joseon
- Korean Empire

=== Japan ===
- Republic of Ezo
- Ryukyu Kingdom

=== Philippines ===
- Sultanate of Maguindanao
- Kingdom of Tondo
- Kingdom of Maynila
- Kingdom of Namayan

=== Vietnam ===
The country of Vietnam in the past was very different from the present. The first Vietnamese kingdom occupied only present-day northern Vietnam. In the 10th century, Vietnam began to push to the south for the next 1000 years, which was called Nam Tiến (southward expansion) in Vietnamese. It conquered other kingdoms and was split by civil war. All the kingdoms that united to form Vietnam are:

- Annam (Chinese province)
- Annam (French protectorate)
- Âu Lạc
- Champa
  - Amaravati (Champa)
  - Kauthara
  - Panduranga (Champa)
  - Vijaya (Champa)
- Cochinchina
- Funan
- Kampuchea Krom
- Nam Việt
- North Vietnam
- Sedang
- South Vietnam
- Tonkin
- Vạn Xuân
- Văn Lang

=== Cambodia/Laos/Thailand ===
- Khmer Empire (Cambodian Empire) 802–1431
- Chenla
- Shambhupura
- Óc Eo
- Langkasuka
- Sukhothai kingdom
- Tambralinga
- Patani Kingdom
- Lanna
- Dvaravati
- Raktamaritika
- Hariphunchai

=== Burma ===
- Pyu city-states (c. 100 BC–c. 840 AD)
- Mon kingdoms (9th–11th, 13th–16th, 18th centuries)
- Singhanavati

=== Malaya/Indonesia ===
- Pasai
- Gangga Negara
- Pan Pan
- Tarumanagara
- Sultanate of Aceh
- Sultanate of Demak
- Majapahit
- Mataram kingdom
- Sunda Kingdom
- Melayu Kingdom
- Singhasari
- Kediri (historical kingdom)
- Malacca Sultanate
- Pala Empire
- Singhasari
- Srivijaya
- Johor Sultanate
- Federation of Malaya
- Kingdom of Pajang
- Sultanate of Sulu and North Borneo – Sulu is now included in the Philippines, while North Borneo is now the Malaysian State of Sabah

== Pre-Columbian America ==
The Americas have historically been home to a number of indigenous states, civilizations and societies of great complexity. Those indigenous states that still existed by the time of the first permanent European colonizations, from the late 15th century onwards, were soon substantively destroyed and/or absorbed. The list below includes both those that ceased to exist before this European arrival, and those that ceased to independently function because of this impact.

Main Articles: Indigenous peoples of the Americas & First Nations peoples in Canada

- Ancestral Puebloans (Anasazi)
- Aztec Empire
- Cahokia
- Carib
- Chachapoya
- Chimú
- Ciboney
- Huari (Wari)
- Inca civilization
- Tiwanaku
- Maya civilization
- Moche (Mochica)
- Nazca (Ica-Nazca)
- Olmec
- Selkʼnam
- Taino
- Timucuan
- Teotihuacan Empire
- Tlaxcala
- Toltecs
- Tahuantinsuyu (the Inca Empire)

In addition, there were a wide variety of pre-Inca cultures, few of which developed into organised states.

== Oceania ==
- Tuʻi Tonga Empire
- Kingdom of Hawaii
- Kingdom of Tahiti
- Kingdom of Bora Bora

See List of Indigenous Australian group names for a list of territories that have ceased to exist as political entities, grouped geographically and by constitutional nature. See List of iwi for a similar list of New Zealand Māori tribal divisions.

== See also ==
- List of Bronze Age states (c. 3300–1200 BC)
- List of Iron Age states (c. 1200–600 BC)
- List of Classical Age states (c. 600 BC-200 AD)
- List of states during Late Antiquity (c. 200–700)
- List of states during the Middle Ages (c. 700–1500)
- List of former sovereign states
- Former countries in Europe after 1815
- List of countries
- List of former national capitals
- List of largest empires
- List of micronations
