= Taifa of Lorca =

Medieval Islamic Moorish taifa kingdom

- 1228–1250
- Capital: Lorca
- Common languages: Arabic, Mozarabic, Hebrew
- Religion: Islam, Christianity (Roman Catholicism), Judaism
- Government: Monarchy
- Historical era: Middle Ages
  - Established: 1228
  - Conquered by Murcia: 1250
- Currency: Dirham and Dinar
Preceded by	Succeeded by
Almohad dynasty	Taifa of Murcia

The Taifa of Lorca (Arabic: طائفة لورقة) was a medieval Islamic Moorish taifa kingdom centered in what is now southern Spain.

The taifa was founded in 1042, when Lorca declared its independence from the emirate of Valencia. Its first governor was Ma'n Ibn Sumadih, with its power base extending from the city to Jaén and Baza.

In 1228, the Lorca taifa was re-established after the fall of the Almohad dynasty. It lasted until around 1250, when it was conquered by the taifa of Murcia.

== List of Emirs ==
=== Ahlid dynasty ===
- Abu 'Abd Allah Muhammad: fl. 13th century (1228–1250)
  - To Murcia: c. 1250?–1266

== See also ==
- List of Sunni Muslim dynasties
