= Taifa of Morón =

Medieval Berber kingdom of the 11th century

Coordinates: 37.11°N 5.38°W

- 1010–1066
- Taifa Kingdom of Morón, c. 1037.
- Capital: Morón
- Common languages: Arabic, Mozarabic, Hebrew
- Religion: Islam, Roman Catholicism, Judaism
- Government: Monarchy
- Historical era: Middle Ages
  - Downfall of Caliphate of Córdoba: 1010
  - Conquered by the Taifa of Seville: 1066
- Currency: Dirham, Dinar
Preceded by	Succeeded by
Caliphate of Córdoba	Taifa of Seville

The Taifa of Morón (Arabic: طائفة مورور) was a medieval Berber taifa kingdom that existed from around 1010 to 1066. From 1066 until 1091 it was under the forcible control of Seville, ruled by Abbad II al-Mu'tadid.

== List of Emirs ==
=== Dammarid dynasty ===
- Abu Tuziri al-Dammari: ?–1013/4
- Nuh: 1013/4–1041/2
- Muhammad: 1041/2–1057
- Manad: 1057–1066

== See also ==
- List of Sunni Muslim dynasties
