= Taifa of Mértola =

Medieval emirate in Portugal

- 1033–1044; 1144–1145; 1146–1151
- Taifa Kingdom of Mértola, c. 1037.
- Capital: Mértola
- Common languages: Arabic, Mozarabic, Hebrew
- Religion: Islam, Christianity (Roman Catholicism), Judaism
- Government: Monarchy
- Historical era: Middle Ages
  - Downfall of Caliphate of Córdoba: 1033
  - To Seville/Almoravids: 1044–1091 / 1091–1144
  - To Badajoz: 1145–1146
  - Conquered by the Almohads: 1151
- Currency: Dirham and Dinar
Preceded by	Succeeded by
Caliphate of Cordoba	Taifa of Seville; Almohads
- Today part of: Portugal

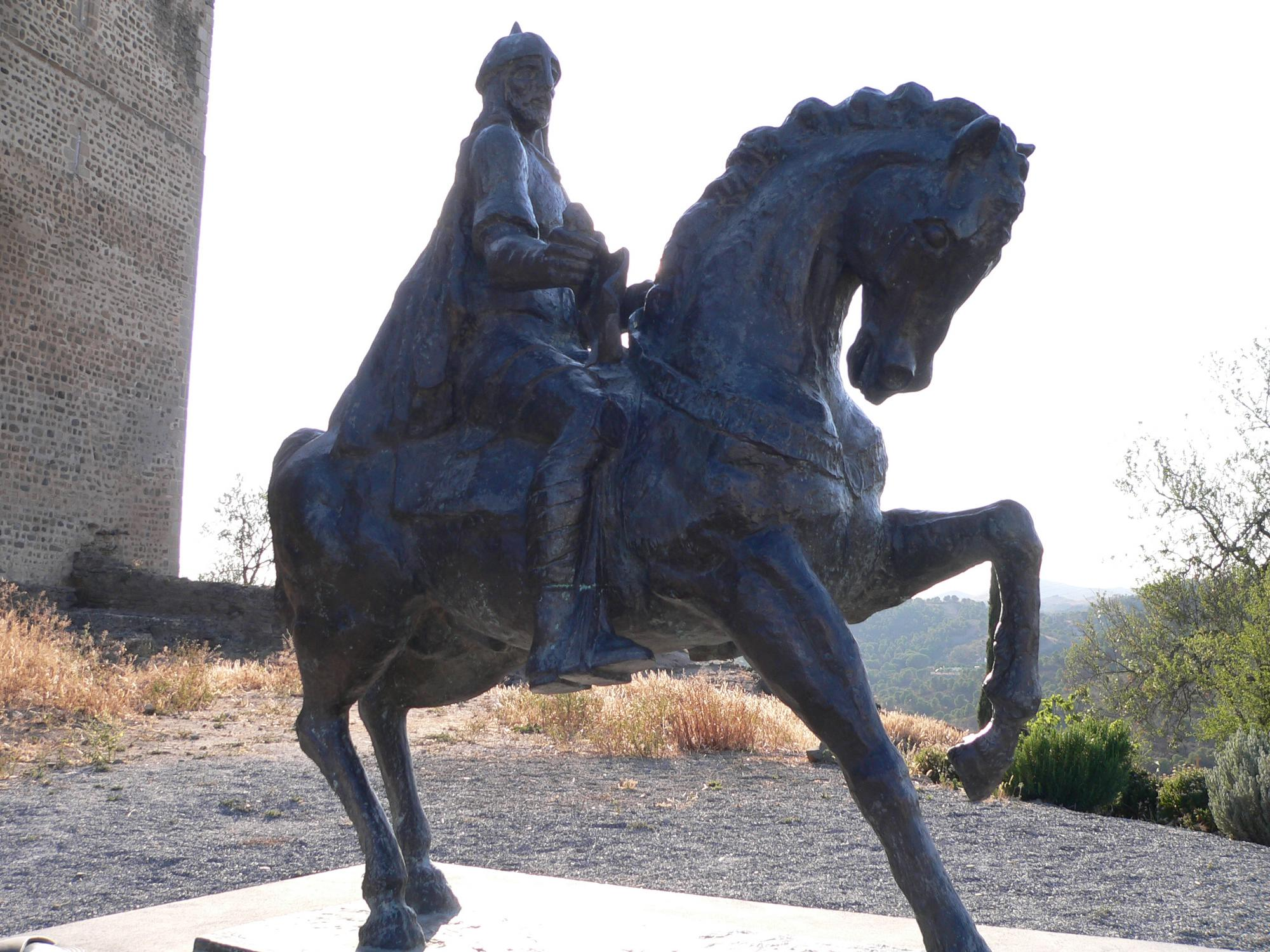
Statue of Ibn Qasi (Lord of Mértola) next to Mértola's Castle.

The Taifa of Mértola (Arabic: طائفة مارتلة) was a medieval Islamic Moorish taifa that existed in what is now southeastern Portugal. It existed during three distinct periods: from 1033 to 1044, from 1144 to 1145, and from 1146 to 1151. From 1044 until 1091 it was under the forcible control of the Taifa of Seville, by Abbad II al-Mu'tadid. Its short-lived history ended in 1151, when it was finally conquered by the Almohad Caliphate.

== List of Emirs ==
=== Abbadid dynasty ===
- Abbad II al-Mu'tadid:1033-1044
  - Becomes part of Seville: 1044–1091 (Abbadid Family)

=== Almoravid dynasty ===
- To Almoravid dynasty: 1091–1144

=== Qasid dynasty ===
- Abu-l-Qasim Ahmad ibn al-Husayn ibn Qasi: 1144–1145, d. 1151
  - To Badajoz: 1145–1146
- Abu-l-Qasim Ahmad ibn al-Husayn ibn Qasi (restored): 1146–1151
  - To Almohads: 1151–1250

== See also ==
- List of Sunni Muslim dynasties
- Taifa of Zaragoza
- Taifa of Seville
- Taifa of Cordoba
