= Taifa of Carmona =

Berber kingdom

Coordinates: 37.4667°N 5.6333°W

- 1013–1150
- Taifa Kingdom of Carmona, c. 1037
- Capital: Carmona, now in Seville, Andalusia, Spain
- Common languages: Arabic, Mozarabic, Hebrew
- Religion: Islam, Christianity (Roman Catholicism), Judaism
- Government: Monarchy
- Historical era: Middle Ages
  - Downfall of Caliphate of Córdoba: 1013
  - To Seville/Almoravid dynasty: 1066–1091 / 1091–1143
  - Conquered by the Almohad Caliphate: 1150
- Currency: Dirham and Dinar
Preceded by	Succeeded by
Caliphate of Cordoba	Taifa of Seville; Almohad Caliphate

The Taifa of Carmona (Arabic: طائفة قرمونة) was a medieval Berber taifa kingdom. It existed for two distinct periods: first from 1013 to 1066 when it was conquered by the Taifa of Seville, and secondly from around 1143 to 1150 when it was finally conquered by the Almohad Caliphate. The taifa was established and ruled by the Zenata Berber Birzalid dynasty.

== Origins ==
The Banu Birzal was a Zenata Berber tribe settled in the Zab region and belonging to the confederations of the central Maghreb (Maghreb al-Awsat).

== List of emirs ==
=== Birzalid dynasty ===
- Abdallah ibn ishaq al-Berzali: 1013/4–1023/4
- Muhammad: 1023/4–1042/3
- Ishaq: 1042/3–1052/3
- Al-'Aziz: 1052/3–1066/7
  - To Seville: 1066/7–1091
  - To Morocco: 1091-c. 1143

=== Darddusid dynasty ===
- Darddus: fl. mid-12th century
  - To Morocco: 1150–1248

== See also ==
- List of Sunni Muslim dynasties
