= Taifa of Jaén =

Moorish kingdom in central Iberia (1145–1168)

- 1145–1168
- Capital: Jaén
- Common languages: Arabic, Mozarabic, Hebrew
- Religion: Islam, Christianity (Roman Catholicism), Judaism
- Government: Monarchy
- Historical era: Middle Ages
  - Established: 1145
  - To the Almohads/Murcia: 1145–1159 / 1159–1168
  - Conquered by the Almohad Caliphate: 1168
- Currency: Dirham and Dinar
Preceded by
Almohads

The Taifa of Jaén (Arabic: طائفة جيان) was a medieval Islamic taifa Moorish kingdom centered in Al-Andalus. It existed for only two very short periods: first in 1145 and then in 1168. It was ruled by Arabs of the Banu Khazraj tribe. The Taifa was centred in the present day region of Jaén in southern Spain.

== List of Emirs ==
=== Yuzaid dynasty ===
- Ibn Yuzai: 1145

=== Huddid dynasty ===
- Abu Dja'far Ahmad Zafadola (also Cord., Gran., Val.): 1145
  - To Almohads: 1145–1159
  - To Murcia: 1159–1168

=== Hamuskid dynasty ===
- Ibrahim: 1168
  - To Murcia: 1168–1232
