= Taifa of Ronda =

Medieval Berber kingdom of the 11th century

Coordinates: 36.7333°N 5.1667°W

- 1039–1065
- Taifa Kingdom of Ronda, c. 1037.
- Capital: Ronda
- Common languages: Arabic, Mozarabic, Berber, Hebrew
- Religion: Islam, Christianity (Roman Catholicism), Judaism
- Government: Monarchy
- Historical era: Middle Ages
  - Established: 1039
  - Conquered by the Taifa of Seville: 1065
- Currency: Dirham and Dinar
| Preceded by | Succeeded by |
| Taifa of Seville | Taifa of Seville |

The Taifa of Ronda (Arabic: طائفة رندة) was a medieval Berber taifa kingdom centered in Moorish al-Andalus in what is now southern Spain. It existed from 1039 to 1065. The taifa was ruled by a family from the Berber Banu Ifran tribe of North Africa. Its capital was the city of Ronda. From 1065 until 1091, the taifa was under the control of the Taifa of Seville, led by Abbad II al-Mu'tadid.

== List of Emirs ==
=== Yafranid dynasty ===
- Abu Nour: 1039/40–1053/4
- Badis ibn Hilal: 1053/4–1057/8
- Abu Nur Hilal (restored): 1057/8
- Abu Nars Fatuh: 1057/8–1065

== See also ==
- List of Sunni Muslim dynasties
