= Taifa of Guadix and Baza =

12th century Moorish taifa kingdom in Granada, Spain

- 1145–1151
- Capital: Guadix
- Common languages: Arabic, Mozarabic, Hebrew
- Religion: Islam, Christianity (Roman Catholicism), Judaism
- Government: Monarchy
- Historical era: Middle Ages
  - Established: 1145
  - Conquered by the Taifa of Murcia: 1151
- Currency: Dirham and Dinar
Preceded by	Succeeded by
Almohad Caliphate	Taifa of Murcia

The Taifa of Guadix and Baza was a medieval Moorish taifa kingdom. It existed from 1145 to 1151, when it was conquered by the Taifa of Murcia.

== List of Emirs ==
=== Malyanid dynasty ===
- Ahmed ibn Muhammed ibn Malyan al-Muta'yyad: 1145–1151
