= Taifa of Tejada =

Medieval Islamic taifa kingdom

- 1146–1150
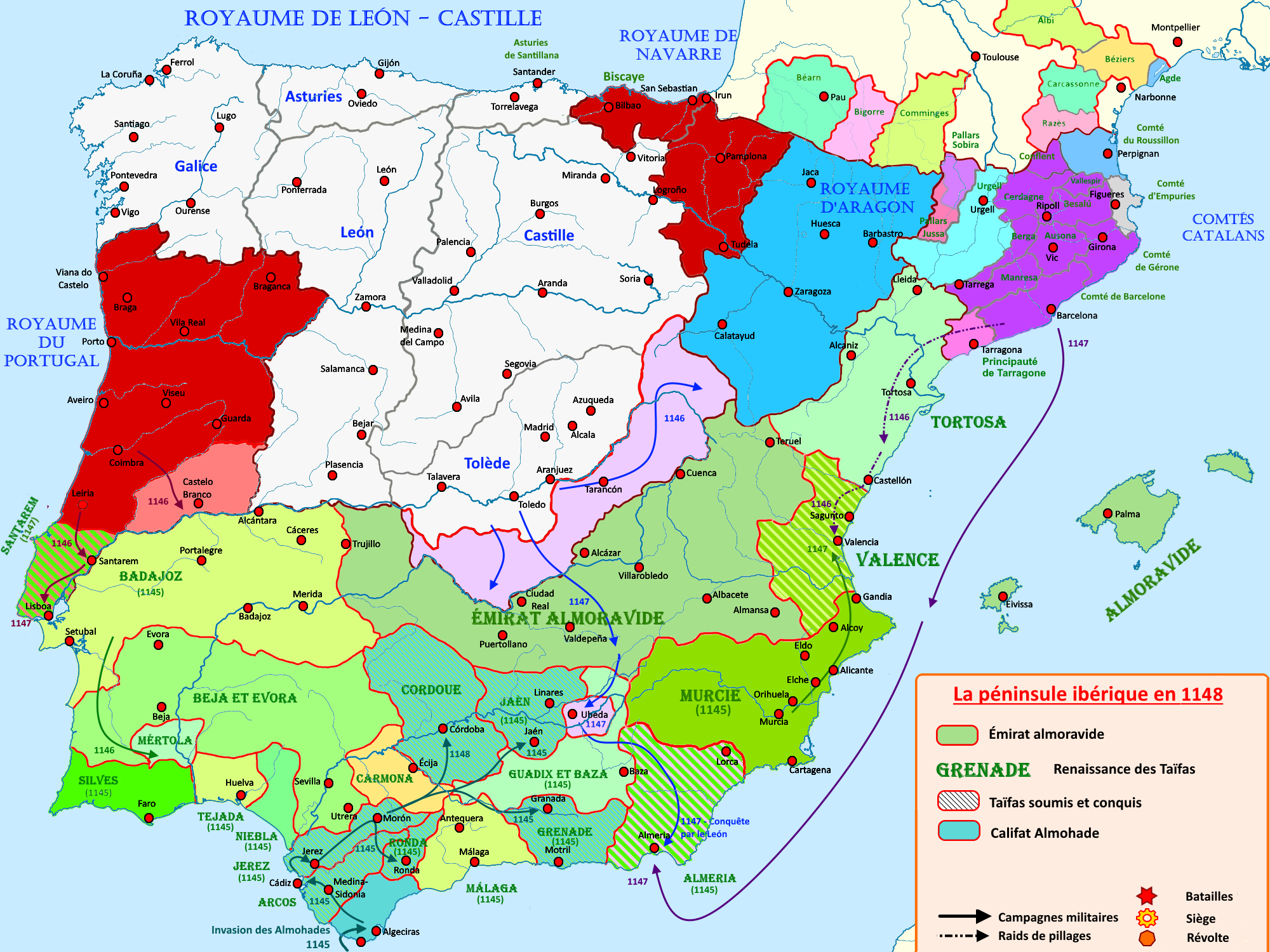
- Map of the Iberian Peninsula in 1148. Note the Taifa of Tejada in the lower left
- Capital: Tejada, Huelva
- Common languages: Arabic, Mozarabic, Hebrew
- Religion: Islam, Christianity (Roman Catholic), Judaism
- Government: Monarchy
- Historical era: Middle Ages
  - Established: 1146
  - Conquered by the Almohad Caliphate: 1150
- Currency: Dirham and Dinar
Preceded by	Succeeded by
Taifa of Silves	Almohad dynasty

The Taifa of Tejada (Arabic: طائفة تيجادا) was a medieval Islamic taifa kingdom in al-Andalus during the second taifa period. It existed from its founding in 1146 to 1150 when it was conquered by the Almohad Caliphate. It was centered at the town of Tejada, Huelva [es] (known as Țalyāṭa/Thalyata in Arabic), which is located in the present day Province of Huelva in southern Spain.

The taifa was ruled by Emir Yusuf al-Bitruyi of the Banu Bitruy family, although he also claimed heritage from the Banu Khazraj tribe. He also was the ruler of the Taifa of Niebla from 1145-1450.

== List of Emirs ==
- Abu al-Walid Mohammed ibn al-Mundir: 1145-1146
- Yusuf al-Bitruyi (in Niebla 1145–?): 1146–1150
