= Taifa of Arcos =

Medieval Berber kingdom of the 11th century

Coordinates: 36.7500°N 5.8000°W

- 1011–1145
- Taifa Kingdom of Arcos, c. 1037
- Capital: Arcos de la Frontera, currently in Cádiz, Andalusia, Spain
- Common languages: Andalusi Arabic, Mozarabic, Hebrew
- Religion: Islam, Roman Catholicism, Judaism
- Government: Monarchy
- Historical era: Middle Ages
  - Downfall of Caliphate of Córdoba: 1011
  - To Seville/Almoravids: 1068–1091 / 1101–1143
  - Conquered by the Almohad Caliphate: 1145
- Currency: Dirham and Dinar
Preceded by	Succeeded by
Caliphate of Cordoba	Taifa of Seville; Almohad dynasty

The Taifa of Arcos (Arabic: طائفة أركش) was a Berber medieval taifa kingdom that existed in two periods; first from 1011 to 1068. Ruled by the Zanata Berber family of the Banū Jizrūn. From 1068 until 1091 it was under the forcible control of Seville, by Abbad II al-Mu'tadid. It regained its independence from 1143 to 1145 when it was finally conquered by the Almohad Caliphate.

The Banū Jizrūn, belonging to the Berber Zanata confederation, led by Muhammad I, seized the cora of Sidonia after expelling the Umayyad governor that ruled. The dynasty proclaimed its independence, giving rise to the kingdom Taifa of Arcos in 1011, with its capital in the present city of Arcos de la Frontera.

== List of Emirs ==
=== Jizrunid dynasty ===
- Muhammad I al-Jazari Imad ad-Dawla: 1011/2–1029/30
- 'Abdun ibn Muhammad: 1029/30–1053
- Muhammad II al-Qaim: 1053–1068/9

=== Conquest ===
- To Seville: 1068/9–1091
- To the Almoravids: 1101–1143

=== Idrisid dynasty ===
- Abu'l-Qasim Ahyal (also in Jerez): 1143–1145
  - To the Almohads: 1145–1248

== See also ==
- List of Sunni Muslim dynasties
