= Taifa of Orihuela =

Medieval moorish kingdom

- 1239–1249
- Capital: Orihuela
- Common languages: Arabic, Mozarabic, Hebrew
- Religion: Islam, Christianity (Roman Catholicism), Judaism
- Government: Monarchy
- Historical era: Middle Ages
  - Established: 1239
  - Conquered by Castile: 1249
- Currency: Dirham, Dinar
Preceded by	Succeeded by
Almohad dynasty	Crown of Castile

The Taifa of Orihuela (Arabic: طائفة أريولة) was a medieval taifa Moorish kingdom. It is estimated to have existed from approximately 1239 to 1249.

== List of Emirs ==
=== Islamic dynasty ===
- Abu Dja'far, who lived during the 13th century.
- Abu'l-Hasam, who died the year 1249 or 1250.
