= Taifa of Santa Maria do Algarve =

Medieval emirate in Portugal

- 1018–1051
- Taifa Kingdom of Santa Maria do Algarve, c. 1037
- Capital: Santa Maria do Algarve
- Common languages: Arabic, Mozarabic, Hebrew
- Religion: Islam, Christianity (Roman Catholicism), Judaism
- Government: Monarchy
- Historical era: Middle Ages
  - Established: 1018
  - Conquered by the Taifa of Seville: 1051
- Currency: Dirham and Dinar
Preceded by	Succeeded by
Taifa of Badajoz	Taifa of Seville
- Today part of: Portugal

The Taifa of Santa Maria do Algarve (Arabic: شنتمرية الغرب, romanized: Shantamariyya al-Gharb) was a medieval Islamic taifa Moorish kingdom or emirate located in what is now southern Portugal, that existed from 1018 to 1051. From 1051 until 1091, it was under the forcible control of Seville via Abbad II al-Mu'tadid. Known as the Banu Harun, their descendants remained as Qadis of the city until its reconquest by Portugal in 1249, the last of whom being Aloandro Ben Bekar.

== List of Emirs ==
=== Harunid dynasty ===
- Sa'id: c. 1018–1041/2
- Muhammad al-Mu'tasim: 1041/2–1051
  - To Seville: 1051–1091

== See also ==
- List of Sunni Muslim dynasties

== Sources ==
- Rei, António (2011–2012). Descendência Hispânica do Profeta do Islão - Exploração de Algumas Linhas Primárias. Instituto Português de Heráldica.
