= Taifa of Segura =

Moorish Taifa (c. 1147–1150)

- 1147–1150
- Capital: Segura
- Common languages: Arabic, Mozarabic, Hebrew
- Religion: Islam, Christianity (Roman Catholicism), Judaism
- Government: Monarchy
- Historical era: Middle Ages
  - Established: 1147
  - Absorbed by Murcia: 1150
- Currency: Dirham and Dinar
Preceded by	Succeeded by
Taifa of Valencia	Taifa of Murcia

The Taifa of Segura (Arabic: طائفة شقورة) was a medieval taifa Moorish kingdom which existed from 1147 to probably around 1150.

== Rulers ==
- Ibn Hamušk: 1147–?
  - To Murcia: c. 1150–1172
