= Taifa of Jerez =

Small independent emirate created c. 1145

- 1145–1145
- Capital: Jerez
- Common languages: Arabic, Mozarabic, Hebrew
- Religion: Islam, Christianity (Roman Catholic), Judaism
- Government: Monarchy
- Historical era: Middle Ages
  - Established: 1145
  - Conquered by the Almohad Caliphate: 1145
- Currency: Dirham and Dinar
Preceded by	Succeeded by
Almohads	Almohads

The Taifa of Jerez (Arabic: طائفة شريش) was a medieval Islamic taifa Moorish kingdom in Jerez de la Frontera at Cádiz in what is now southern Spain. Established in 1146, it existed until it was conquered by the Almohad Caliphate.

Jerez remained under Muslim rule until 1261. Following the collapse of the Almohad Caliphate, it was ruled by Arabs of the Banu Khazraj tribe. It was conquered by the Christian forces of Alphonse X of Castile.

== List of Emirs ==
- Abu'l-Qaim Ahyal: 1145
- Abu'l-Gammar: 1145
- 'Ali: 1145
  - To the Almohads
