= Taifa of Murviedro and Sagunto =

Medieval Taifa kingdom

- 1088–1092
- Capital: Murviedro
- Common languages: Arabic, Mozarabic, Hebrew
- Religion: Islam, Roman Catholicism, Judaism
- Government: Monarchy
- Historical era: Middle Ages
  - Established: 1088
  - Conquered by the Almoravids: 1092
- Currency: Dirham and Dinar
| Preceded by | Succeeded by |
| Taifa of Valencia | Almoravid dynasty |

The Taifa of Murviedro and Sagunto was a medieval taifa kingdom that existed in a short period from 1088 to 1092.

== List of Emirs ==
=== Lubbunid dynasty ===
- Abu 'Isa Lubbun: 1088–1092
