= Taifa of Tavira =

Medieval Taifa kingdom

- 1146–1150
- Capital: Tavira
- Common languages: Arabic, Mozarabic, Hebrew
- Religion: Islam, Christianity (Roman Catholic), Judaism
- Government: Monarchy
- Historical era: Middle Ages
  - Established: 1146
  - Absorbed by the Almohads: 1150
- Currency: Dirham and Dinar
Preceded by	Succeeded by
Taifa of Silves	Almohad dynasty
- Today part of: Portugal

The Taifa of Tavira (Arabic: طائفة تاويرا) was a medieval Islamic taifa Moorish kingdom in what is now southern Portugal. It existed only from around 1146 to 1150. It was centered in the city of Tavira.

== List of Emirs ==
=== 'Umarid dynasty ===
- 'Umar: fl. mid-12th century (1146–1150)
  - To Almoravids: c. 1150–1250
