= Taifa of Santarém =

Short-lived medieval emirate in Portugal

- 1144–1145
- Capital: Santarém
- Common languages: Arabic, Mozarabic, Hebrew
- Religion: Islam, Christianity (Roman Catholicism), Judaism
- Government: Monarchy
- Historical era: Middle Ages
  - Established: 1144
  - Conquered by Badajoz: 1145
- Currency: Dirham and Dinar
Preceded by	Succeeded by
Almoravid dynasty	Taifa of Badajoz
- Today part of: Portugal

The Taifa of Santarém (Arabic: طائفة شنترين) was a medieval Islamic taifa Moorish kingdom in what is now central Portugal. It existed from 1144 to 1145. It was centered in the city of Santarém and encompassed much of the present day Santarém District. The Taifa was ruled by the Arab tribe of Banu Khazraj which had its origin in the Hejaz region of Arabia.

== List of Emirs ==
=== Labidid dynasty ===
- Labid: 1144–1145
  - To Badajoz: c. 1145–1147
