= Taifa of Niebla =

Medieval emirate in Portugal and Spain

Coordinates: 37.3500°N 6.6667°W

- 1023–1262
- Taifa Kingdom of Niebla, c. 1037.
- Capital: Niebla
- Common languages: Arabic, Mozarabic, Hebrew
- Religion: Islam, Christianity (Roman Catholicism), Judaism
- Government: Monarchy
- Historical era: Middle Ages
  - Established: 1023
  - To Seville/Almoravid dynasty: 1053–1091 / 1091–1145
  - To the Almohad caliphate: 1150–1234
  - Conquered by Castile: 1262
- Currency: Dirham and Dinar
Preceded by	Succeeded by
Caliphate of Cordoba	Taifa of Seville; Crown of Castile

The Taifa of Niebla (Arabic: طائفة لبلة) was an Arab taifa kingdom that existed during three distinct time periods: from 1023 to 1053, from 1145 to 1150 and from 1234 to 1262.

From 1053 until 1091 it was under the forcible control of Taifa of Seville, by Abbad II al-Mu'tadid. It was finally conquered by the Crown of Castile. In 1262 it was eventually absorbed by Castile.

== List of Emirs ==
=== Yahsubid dynasty ===
- Abu'l-Abbas Ahmad: 1023/4–1041/2
- Muhammad al-Yahsubi Izz ad-Dawla: 1041/2–1051/2
- Abu Nars Fath: 1051/2–1053/4
  - To Seville: 1053/4–1091
  - To Morocco: 1091–c. 1145

=== Bitruyid dynasty ===
- Yusuf al-Bitruyi (in Tejada 1146–1150): 1145–11??, d. 1150
- al-Wahbi: 11??–1150
  - To Morocco: 1150–1234

=== Mahfuzid dynasty ===
- Su'ayb: 1234–1262
  - To Castile thereafter.

== See also ==
- List of Sunni Muslim dynasties
