= Abu al-Qasim Muhammad ibn Abbad =

Abbadid dynasty ruler of Seville from 1023 to 1042

Abu al-Qasim Muhammad ibn Abbad I

Emir of the Seville Taifa
- Reign: 1023–25 January 1042
- Predecessor: Position established
- Successor: Abbad II al-Mu'tadid
- Born: c. 984; Al-Andalus
- Died: 25 January 1042; Seville (Spain)
- Burial: Seville
- Children: Abbad II al-Mu'tadid
Names
- Abu al-Qasim Muhammad ibn Abbad (Arabic: أبو القاسم محمد بن عباد)
- Dynasty: Abbadid
- Father: Isma'il ibn Qarays ibn Abbad ibn Amr ibn Aslan ibn Amr ibn Itlaf ibn Na'im ibn Na'im al-Lakhmi
- Religion: Sunni Islam

Abu al-Qasim Muhammad ibn Abbad (or Abbad I; 984 – 25 January 1042) (Arabic: أبو القاسم بن عباد) was the eponymous founder of the Abbadid dynasty; he was the first independent Muslim ruler of Seville in Al-Andalus ruling from 1023 until his death in 1042.

Abu al-Qasim Muhammad ibn Abbad was a qadi (religious judge) when he was named governor of Seville by the caliph of Cordoba, Yahya ibn Ali ibn Hammud al-Mu'tali, in 1023. However, with the Caliphate of Cordoba losing its integrity, the Abbadids, a Sevillan family of Arabic origins, seized control.

As a result, later in 1023, Abu al-Qasim Muhammad ibn Abbad declared Seville independent from Córdoban rule, establishing the taifa of Seville.

== Sources ==
- Haarmann, Ulrich (1990). Geschichte der Arabischen Welt. Munich: C.H. Beck.

New title Independence from the Caliphate of Córdoba	Abbadid emir of Seville; 1023–1042	Succeeded by Abbad II al-Mu'tadid
