= Taifa of Saltés and Huelva =

Medieval Arab kingdom of the 11th century

Coordinates: 37.2167°N 6.9500°W

- 1012–1051
- Taifa Kingdom of Saltés and Huelva, c. 1037.
- Capital: Saltés
- Common languages: Arabic, Mozarabic, Hebrew
- Religion: Islam, Christianity (Roman Catholicism), Judaism
- Government: Monarchy
- Historical era: Middle Ages
  - Established: 1012
  - Conquered by Seville: 1051
- Currency: Dirham and Dinar
Preceded by	Succeeded by
Taifa of Badajoz	Taifa of Seville
- Today part of: Spain; Portugal

The Taifa of Saltés and Huelva (Arabic: طائفة ولبة وشلطيش) was a medieval Arab taifa kingdom that existed in southern Iberia from around 1012 to 1051. From 1051 until 1091 it was under the forcible control of Seville, by Abbad II al-Mu'tadid.

The geographer al-Bakri (d. 1094) was born in the taifa of Saltés and Huelva.

== List of Emirs ==
=== Bakrid dynasty ===
- 'Abd al-'Aziz 'Izz ad-Dawla: 1012/3–1051/2 or 53
