= Taifa of Silves =

Medieval emirate in Southern Portugal

Coordinates: 37.1833°N 8.4333°W

- 1027–1150
- Taifa Kingdom of Silves, c. 1037.
- Capital: Silves (Shilb)
- Common languages: Arabic, Mozarabic, Hebrew
- Religion: Islam, Christianity (Roman Catholicism), Judaism
- Government: Monarchy
- Historical era: Middle Ages
  - Established: 1027
  - To Seville/Almoravid dynasty: 1063–1091 / 1091–1145
  - Conquered by the Almohads: 1150
- Currency: Dirham and Dinar
Preceded by	Succeeded by
Taifa of Badajoz	Taifa of Seville; Almohad dynasty
- Today part of: Portugal

The Taifa of Silves (Arabic: طائفة شلب, Ṭā'ifa Šilb) was an Arab taifa kingdom that existed in what is now southern Portugal for two distinct periods: from 1027 to 1063, and again from 1145 to 1150, when it was finally conquered by the Almohad Caliphate.

The taifa occupied the westernmost part of the presently Portuguese region of Algarve, near Cape St. Vincent, with its capital in Silves. The Taifa of Silves was constituted in the early 11th century and starting from 1048, the power was held by the family of the Banu Muzayn, including three emirs: Isa II al-Muzaffar (1048–1053), Muhammad II al-Nasir (1053–1058), and Isa III al-Muzaffar (1058–1063). Under the latter the kingdom was conquered by the more powerful taifa of Seville, led by Abbad II al-Mu'tadid.

During the so-called second taifa period, which followed the fall of the Almoravid dynasty, Silves was the seat of a second, ephemeral taifa, which lasted from 1145 to 1150, when it was conquered by the Almohads.

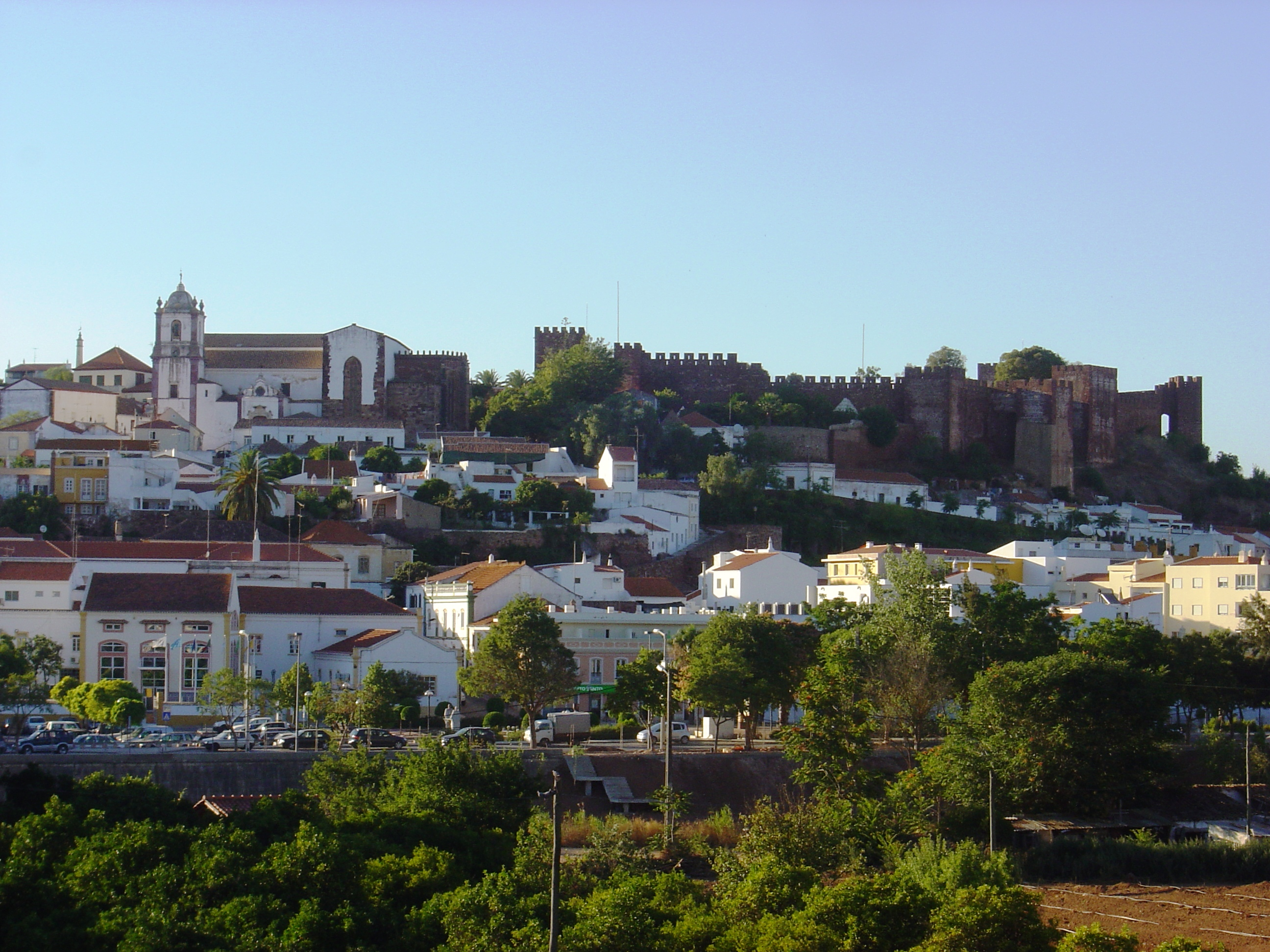
View of Silves with its moorish castle.

== List of Emirs ==
=== Banu Muzayn ===
- 'Isa I: 1027–1040/1
- Muhammad I: 1040/1–1048
- 'Isa II: 1048–1053
- Muhammad II: 1053–1058
- 'Isa III: 1058–1063
  - To Seville: 1063–1091
  - To Morocco: 1091–1145

=== al-Mundirid dynasty ===
- Abu'l-Walid Muhammad: 1145–1150
  - To Morocco: 1150–1250

== See also ==
- List of Sunni Muslim dynasties
- Siege of Silves (1189)
