= Taifa of Murcia =

Arab taifa of Al-Andalus

- 1011–1266
- Taifa Kingdom of Murcia, c. 1037.
- Capital: Murcia
- Common languages: Arabic, Mozarabic, Ladino, Berber
- Religion: Islam, Christianity (Roman Catholic), Judaism
- Government: Monarchy
- Historical era: Middle Ages
  - Downfall of Caliphate of Córdoba: 1011
  - To Almeria/Valencia: 1014–1038 / 1038–1065
  - To Seville/Almoravids: 1078–1091 / 1091–1145
  - To Valencia: 1145–1147
  - To the Almohads: 1172–1228
  - Annexed by Castile: 1266
- Currency: Dirham and Dinar
Preceded by	Succeeded by
Caliphate of Cordoba	Taifa of Seville; Kingdom of Murcia

The Taifa of Murcia (Arabic: طائفة مرسية) was an Arab taifa of medieval Al-Andalus, in what is now southern Spain. It became independent as a taifa centered on the Moorish city of Murcia after the fall of the Umayyad Caliphate of Córdoba (11th century). The Moorish Taifa of Murcia included Albacete and part of Almería as well.

The taifa is apparently the one that existed the greatest number of separate time periods (five): from 1011 to 1014, from 1065 to 1078, in 1145, from 1147 to 1172 and finally from 1228 to 1266 when it was absorbed by Castile, becoming the Kingdom of Murcia, one of the constituent kingdoms of the Crown of Castile.

== History ==
=== Foundation ===
In the year 713, only two years after the Moorish invasion of the Peninsula, the emir Abd al Aziz occupied the province. Murcia was founded with the name of Medīnah Mursīyyah in A.D. 825 by Abd ar-Rahman II, emir of Al-Andalus. The Moors, taking advantage of the course of the river Segura, created a complex network of irrigation channels that made the town prosperous and is the predecessor of the modern irrigation system. The traveller Muhammad al-Idrisi described it in the 12th century as populous and strongly fortified.

=== Establishment of the kingdom ===
After the fall of the Caliphate of Cordoba in 1031, Murcia passed successively under the rule of Almería, Toledo and Seville. From 1078 until 1091 it was under the forcible control of Seville, by Abbad II al-Mu'tadid.

In 1165, Ibn Mardanish was defeated in the Battle of Fahs al-Jullab by the Almohads. In 1172 Murcia was taken by the Almohads, and from 1223 to 1243 it became the capital of an independent kingdom. In 1243 it was conquered and under the Treaty of Alcaraz swore fealty to Castille.

=== Aragon then Castile ===
Banner of the Castilian Realm of Murcia

James II called Jaume II el Just or the Just, a grandson of James I, initiated in 1296 a final impulse of his army further southwards than the Biar-Busot pacts. His campaign aimed at the fertile countryside around Murcia whose local Muslim rulers were bound by pacts with Castile and governing by proxy on behalf of this kingdom; Castilian troops often raided the area to assert a sovereignty which, in any case, was not stable but characterized by the typical skirmishes and ever changing alliances of a frontier territory.

The Castilians, led by King Alfonso X, took the Kingdom of Murcia at the end of this period, when large numbers of immigrants from north Catalonia and Provence settled in the town; Catalan names are still not uncommon. In 1296, Murcia and its region were transferred to the Crown of Aragon, but in 1304, in virtue of the Treaty of Torrellas, it was finally incorporated as part of the Crown of Castile.

== List of rulers ==
From 1012 to around 1049, Murcia was ruled by the rulers of the taifas of Almería, Valencia or Dénia.

=== Tahirids ===
- c. 1049 – 1063: Abu Bakr Ahmad ibn Tahir
- 1063–1078: Muhammad ibn Ahmad ibn Tahir
- To Seville
- Almoravid conquest, 1091
- 1096–1097: Abu Ja'far Ahmad ibn Abi Ja'far Abd al-Rahman Ibn Tahir
- Almoravid conquest

=== Hudids ===
- 1145–1147: Abu Muhammad Abd Allah ibn Iyad
  - 1146: Abd Allah ibn Faraj al-Thaghri, rival

Throwing off Almoravid authority, Ibn Iyad of Murcia recognized the supremacy of the Hudid ruler Sayf al-Dawla in 1146.

- 1148–1172: Ibn Mardanish
- Almohad conquest
- 1228–1238: Abu Abdallah Muhammad ibn Yusuf Ibn Hud al-Mutawakkil
- 1238–1239: Abu Bakr Muhammad ibn Muhammad al-Wathiq (first time)
- 1239–1241: Diya' al-Dawla al-'AzIz ibn 'Abd al-Malik
- 1241–1262: Abu Ja'far Baha' al-Dawla Muhammad Ibn Hud
- 1262–1264: Muhammad ibn Abi Ja'far Muhammad
- 1264–????: Abu Bakr Muhammad ibn Muhammad al-Wathiq (second time)

Sometime between 1264 and the Aragonese conquest of 1266, Abu Bakr was overthrown by Abdallah ibn Ali of the Banu Ashqilula, allies of the Nasrids of Granada.

== See also ==
- List of Sunni Muslim dynasties
