= Taifa =

Independent states of al-Andalus

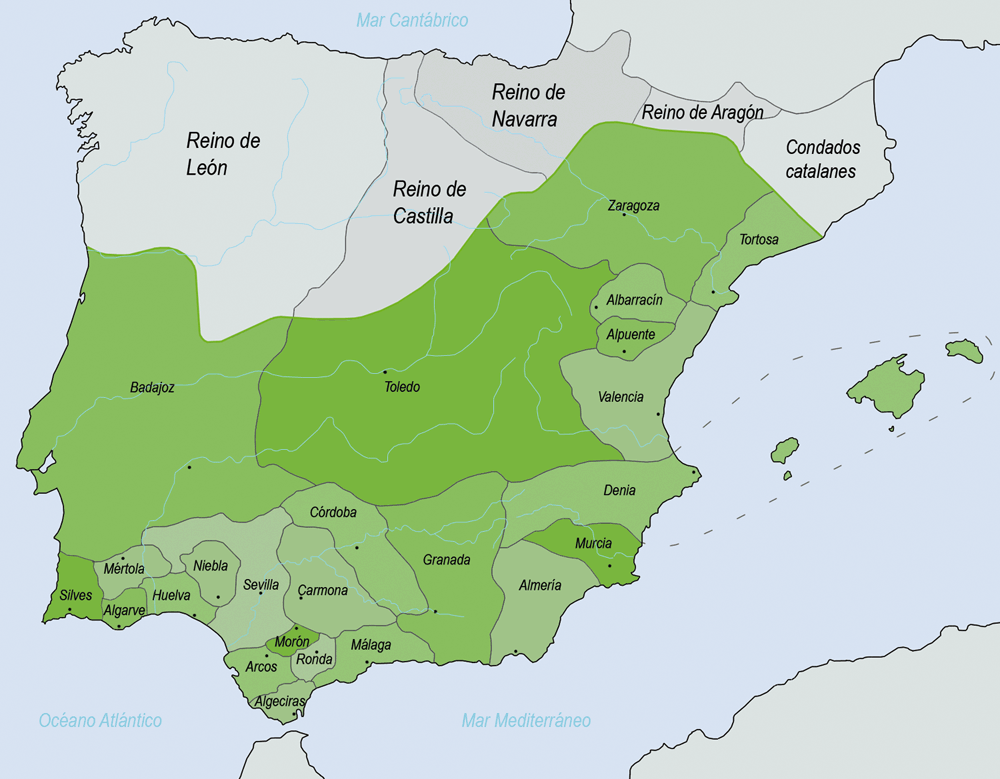
The taifas (green) in 1031

The taifas (from Arabic: طائفة ṭā'ifa, plural طوائف ṭawā'if, meaning "party, band, faction") were the independent Muslim principalities and kingdoms of the Iberian Peninsula (modern Portugal and Spain), referred to by Muslims as al-Andalus, that emerged from the decline and fall of the Umayyad Caliphate of Córdoba between 1009 and 1031. They were a recurring feature of al-Andalus history.

The taifas were eventually incorporated by the Almoravid dynasty in the late 11th century and, on its collapse, many taifas re-appeared only to be incorporated by the Almohad Caliphate. The fall of the Almohads resulted in a flourishing of the taifas, and this was the case despite constant warfare with Christian kingdoms. Taifa kings were wary of calling themselves "kings", so they took the title of hajib, presenting themselves as representatives for a temporarily absent caliph. The taifa courts were renowned centres of cultural excellence in which poets, scientists, and other scholars were able to thrive.

Wars between the taifas were common and rulers of Muslim taifas were known to ally with the Iberian Christians (and the North African kingdoms) against European or Mediterranean Christian rulers from outside of al-Andalus. These alliances frequently included payments of large tributes in return for security. Eventually, the taifas of Badajoz, Toledo, Zaragoza, and even Sevilla paid tribute to Alfonso VI. By the end of the 13th century, only one remained, the Emirate of Granada, the rest being incorporated into the Christian states of the north.

== Etymology ==
The Arabic term mulūk al-ṭawāʾif means "kings of the territorial divisions" or "party kings". Muslim historians originally used these terms to refer to the Parthian Empire and other regional rulers that succeeded Alexander the Great. That period was treated as an interlude between Alexander's conquest of Persia and the formation of the Sasanian Empire. The negative portrayal of the Parthian period by Muslim historians may have been inherited from Sasanian propaganda. In the 11th century, Ṣāʿid al-Andalusī first applied the term to the regional rulers who appeared after the collapse of Umayyad power in Spain, "whose condition was like that of the mulūk al-ṭawāʾif of the Persians". The phrase implied cultural decline.

The corresponding term in Spanish is reyes de taifas ("kings of taifas"), by way of which the Arabic term has entered English (and French) usage.

== Rise ==
The origins of the taifas must be sought in the administrative division of the Umayyad Caliphate of Córdoba, as well in the ethnic division of the elite of this state, divided among Arabs, Berbers, Muladíes (indigenous Muslim converts, a significant majority) and the Saqaliba, Eastern European former slaves. The most secure rulers were governors of frontier provinces, such as the "Farthest Frontier" of Zaragoza; since these regions had been ruled by families for generations prior to the fall of the caliphate, there was minor immediate impact when the caliphate fell.

During the late 11th century, the Christian rulers of the northern Iberian peninsula set out to retake the lands of the former Visigothic Kingdom that had been conquered by Muslims. By this time the caliphate of Cordova, among the richest and most powerful states in Europe, had suffered a civil war, known as the Fitna of al-Andalus. As a result, it "broke into taifas, small rival emirates fighting among themselves".

However, the political decline and chaos was not immediately followed by cultural decline. To the contrary, intense intellectual and literary activity grew in some of the larger taifas.

There was a second period when taifas arose, toward the middle of the 12th century, when the Almoravid rulers were in decline.

During the heyday of the taifas, in the 11th century and again in the mid 12th century, their emirs (rulers) competed among themselves, not only militarily but also for cultural prestige. They tried to recruit the most famous poets and artisans.

== Decline ==
Observers in al-Andalus in the 1080s did not see a decline as likely, much less imminent or probable. However, by the 1090s, popular revolt became a real possibility as the ulama accusations against taifa kings gained popularity.

Reversing the trend of the Umayyad period, when the Christian kingdoms of the north often had to pay tribute to the Caliph, the disintegration of the Caliphate left the rival Muslim kingdoms much weaker than their Christian counterparts, particularly the Castilian–Leonese monarchy, and many had to submit to them, paying tributes known as parias.

Due to their military weakness, taifa princes appealed for North African warriors to come fight Christian kings on two occasions. The Almoravid dynasty was invited after the fall of Toledo (1085), and the Almohad Caliphate after the fall of Lisbon (1147). Warriors of the taifas took part in the Battle of Sagrajas, which resulted in the defeat of the Christians. Nevertheless, the Almoravids and the Almohads did not help the taifa emirs but rather annexed their lands to their own North African empires.

In the 1100s, the remnants of the taifa dynasties in al-Andalus would join forces with Christian powers as a last attempt to shift momentum back in their favor against the Almoravids.

Certain taifas hired Christian mercenaries to fight neighbouring realms (both Christian and Muslim). The most dynamic taifa, which conquered most of its neighbours before the Almoravid invasion, was Seville, which ironically was also the first of the major taifas to fall, followed (somewhat quickly) by Badajoz, Valencia and Zaragoza. Zaragoza was also very powerful and expansive, but inhibited by the neighbouring Christian states of the Pyrenees. Zaragoza, Toledo, and Badajoz had previously been the border military districts of the Caliphate.

== List of taifas ==
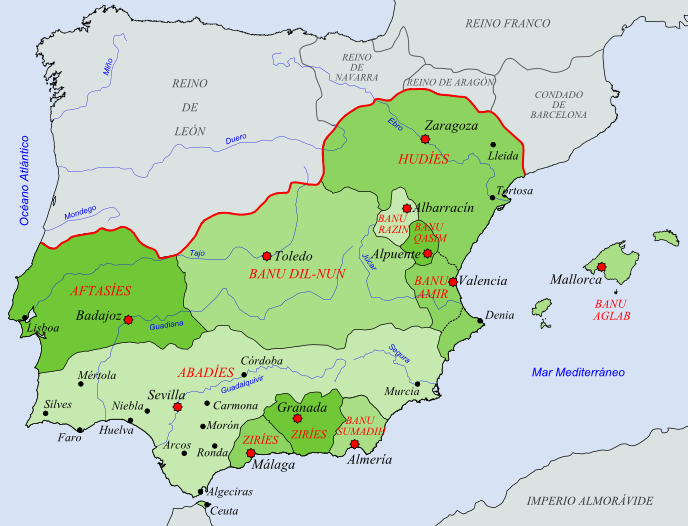
The taifas in 1080

=== First period (11th century) ===
After the fall of the Caliphate of Cordoba in 1031 about 33 independent taifas emerged from the civil war and conflict in al-Andalus. Many of the less tenable taifa kingdoms had disappeared by the 1030s, having been taken over by more powerful neighboring taifas. The strongest and largest taifas in this first period (11th century) were the Taifa of Zaragoza, Taifa of Toledo, Taifa of Badajoz and the Taifa of Seville. The most notable taifa to conquer most of its weak neighbours was the Taifa of Seville under the Abbadid dynasty.

==== Al-Tagr al-Adna (Central Portugal) ====
This region includes the Central and Lisbon region of Portugal and Extremadura region of Spain.

- Badajoz 1013–1022/1034–1094 (Aftasid Dynasty); 1027–1034 (to Seville): 1094 (to Almoravids)
- Lisbon 1022–1034 (Banu Sabur Dynasty); 1034–1093 (Aftasid Dynasty)

==== Al-Garb (Southern Portugal) ====
This region includes the Alentejo and Algarve region of Portugal.

- Mértola 1033–1044 (Tayfurid Dynasty); 1044–1091 (to Seville)
- Saltés and Huelva 1012/1013–1051/1053 (Bakrid Dynasty); 1051–1091 (to Seville)
- Santa Maria do Algarve 1018–1051 (Harunid Dynasty); 1051–1091 (to Seville)
- Silves: 1027–1063 (Muzaymid Dynasty); 1063–1091 (to Seville)

==== Al-Tagr al-Awsat (Central Spain) ====
This region includes the Madrid region and the provinces of Toledo and Guadalajara of Spain.

- Toledo: 1010/1031–1085 (to Castile)

==== Southern Spain ====
This region includes the autonomous region of Andalucia in Spain

- Algeciras: 1035–1058 (to Seville)
- Arcos: 1011–1068 (to Seville)
- Carmona: 1013–1091 (to Seville)
- Ceuta: 1061–1084 (to Granada)
- Córdoba: 1031–1091 (to Seville)
- Granada: 1013–1090 (to Almoravids)
- Málaga: 1026–1057/1058 (to Granada); 1073–1090 (to Almoravids)
- Morón: 1013–1066 (to Seville)
- Niebla: 1023/1024–1091 (to Seville)
- Ronda: 1039/1040–1065 (to Seville)
- Seville: 1023–1091 (to Almoravids)

==== Al-Tagr al-A'la (Aragon and Catalonia) ====
This region only includes the provinces of Huesca, Lleida, Teruel, Zaragoza and Tarragona of Spain.

- Albarracín: 1011–1104 (to Almoravids)
- Alpuente: 1009–1106 (to Almoravids)
- Rueda: 1118–1130 (to Aragon)
- Tortosa: 1039–1060 (to Zaragoza); 1081/1082–1092 (to Denia)
- Zaragoza: 1018–1046 (to Banu Tujib; then to Banu Hud); 1046–1110 (to Almoravids; in 1118 to Aragon)

==== Al-Xarq (Eastern Spain) ====
This region includes the region of Valencia, Murcia and Baleares.

- Almería: 1011–1091 (to Almoravids)
- Denia: 1010/1012–1076 (to Zaragoza)
- Jérica: 11th century (to Toledo)
- Lorca: 1051–1091 (to Almoravids)
- Majorca: 1018–1203 (to Almohads)
- Molina: ?–1100 (to Aragon)
- Murcia: 1011/1012–1065 (to Valencia)
- Murviedro and Sagunto: 1086–1092 (to Almoravids)
- Segorbe: 1065–1075 (to Almoravids)
- Valencia: 1010/1011–1094 (to El Cid, nominally vassal of Castile but allied to Banu Hud)

=== Second period (12th century) ===
- Almería: 1145–1147 (briefly to Castile and then to Almohads)
- Arcos: 1143 (to Almohads)
- Badajoz: 1145–1150 (to Almohads)
- Beja and Évora: 1144–1150 (to Almohads)
- Carmona: dates and destiny uncertain or unknown
- Constantina and Hornachuelos: dates and destiny uncertain or unknown
- Granada: 1145 (to Almohads)
- Guadix and Baza: 1145–1151 (to Murcia)
- Jaén: 1145–1159 (to Murcia); 1168 (to Almohads)
- Jerez: 1145 (to Almohads)
- Málaga: 1145–1153 (to Almohads)
- Mértola: 1144–1145 (to Badajoz)
- Murcia: 1145 (to Valencia); 1147–1172 (to Almohads)
- Niebla: 1145–1150? (to Almohads)
- Purchena: dates and destiny uncertain or unknown
- Ronda: 1145 (to Almoravids)
- Santarém: ?–1147 (to Portugal)
- Segura: 1147–? (destiny unknown)
- Silves: 1144–1155 (to Almohads)
- Tavira: dates and destiny uncertain or unknown
- Tejada: 1145–1150 (to Almohads)
- Valencia: 1145–1172 (to Almohads)

=== Third period (13th century) ===
- Arjona: 1232–1244 (to Castile)
- Baeza: 1224–1226 (to Castile)
- Ceuta: 1233–1236 (to Almohads), 1249–1305 (to Marinids)
- Denia: 1224–1227 (to Aragon)
- Lorca: 1240–1265 (to Castile)
- Menorca: 1228–1287 (to Aragon)
- Murcia: 1228–1266 (to Castile)
- Niebla: 1234–1262 (to Castile)
- Orihuela: 1239/1240–1249/1250 (to Murcia or Castile)
- Valencia: 1228/1229–1238 (to Aragon)

Additionally, but not usually considered taifas, are:

- Granada: 1237–1492 (to Castile)
- Las Alpujarras: 1568–1571 (to Castile)
