= Taifa of Seville =

Arab State ruled by Abbadids (1023–1091)

Taifa of Seville طائفة إشبيليّة (Arabic) طايڢة دَشَبِيلّة (Mozarabic) Reino abadí de Sevilla (Spanish)
- 1023–1091
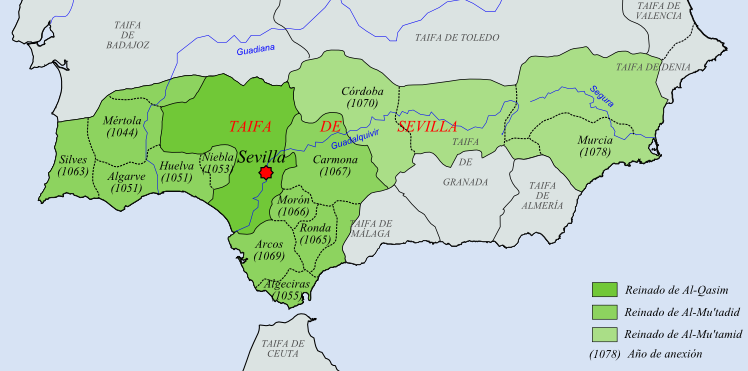
- The Taifa of Seville at its greatest extent in green, c. 1080
- Capital: Seville
- Common languages: Arabic, Berber, Mozarabic, Hebrew
- Religion: Islam, Roman Catholicism, Judaism
- Government: Monarchy
- Historical era: Middle Ages
  - Downfall of Caliphate of Córdoba: 1023
  - Death of last king Al-Mu'tamid and defeat after Almoravid troops: 1091
- Currency: Dirham and Dinar
Preceded by	Succeeded by
Caliphate of Córdoba	Almoravid dynasty
- Today part of: Spain; Portugal; Gibraltar

The Taifa of Seville (Arabic: طائفة إشبيليّة Ta'ifat-u Ishbiliyyah) was an Arab kingdom which was ruled by the Abbadid dynasty. It was established in 1023 and lasted until 1091, in what is today southern Spain and Portugal. It gained independence from the Caliphate of Cordoba and it expanded the territory it ruled in the mid-11th century. The emerging power of Castile led Seville to ask military assistance from the Almoravids, who then occupied Seville.

== History ==
The taifa (principality) began as a small, weakly-defended territory comprising parts of the modern Spanish provinces of Seville, Huelva, and Cádiz, but quickly emerged as the most powerful taifa of the time, after its rulers began a policy of expansion.

The first emir of Seville was Abu al-Qasim (1023–1042). He was qadi of Seville and declared independence from the Caliphate of Córdoba after its downfall in 1031, becoming Abbad I, emir of Seville. His son, Abbad II al-Mu'tadid (1042–1069) who succeeded him, expanded the taifa by conquering Mertola, Niebla, Saltés and Huelva, Silves, Santa María de Algarve during his reign.

His son, Muhammad al-Mu'tamid (1069–1091), turned Seville into a major centre of Ibero-Muslim culture. Many artists of the time moved to the court of Seville, like the Almería poet Ibn al-Abbar and Abu Amir ibn Maslama, while Abu'l-Walid al-Himyari made a compilation of both of their literary works.

Al-Mu'tamid seized Córdoba in 1071, and maintained a precarious hold on the city until 1091 (with a brief interlude in 1075–1078). While his vizier and fellow poet Ibn Ammar, conquered Murcia. Seville began paying tribute to King Alfonso VI of Castile. The court felt insecure from Castile's military successes in Aragon, Valencia, and especially the fall of Toledo in 1085 under Alfonso VI. In 1085, the Taifa of Seville was attacked by Christian mercenaries who passed over the Taifa of Granada leading to Seville weakened by the time the Almoravids arrived. The Almoravids established themselves at Algeciras, and after allying with the taifas of Seville, Granada, and Almeria (al-Mu'tamid led the al-Andalusan forces) they defeated the Christians at the Battle of Sagrajas in 1086, and occupied the other Muslim taifas, including Seville itself in 1091. Following this, the Almoravids would go on to occupy and control vast swathes of southern Spain. After they ravaged the city, al-Mu'tamid ordered his sons to surrender the royal fortress (the location of the present-day Alcázar of Seville).

== Culture, science and industry ==
Like the other taifas in the 11th century, the Taifa of Seville was a Muslim-majority territory. It did have Christians and Jewish inhabitants, although they were often treated as secondary to Muslims. Christian inhabitants of al-Andalus who adopted Arabic culture were called Mozarab Christians, "Mozarab" being a corruption of the Arabic must'arab which meant "Arabized". Antisemitism certainly existed, but compared to their Christian neighbors to the north, the taifas was far more tolerant. Jews were known to attain high governmental positions, like how the taifas of Granada and Seville both went to war under Jewish prime ministers.

Toledan judge and historian of science Said ibn Said labelled the Taifa of Seville as the “kingdom of poetry”. Seville’s poetry largely focused on wine and eroticism, with poets who performed for their king being given the opportunity to earn riches and land. Seville’s rulers were strong proponents of the arts and sciences. Al-Mutadid hosted the acclaimed Andalusian poet Ibn Zaydun while al-Mu'tamid, is noted as a skilled poet himself. Most of al-Mutadid's poetry had to do with conquests, while his son's poetry was noted to be sentimental and romantic even when describing events like the conquest of Córdoba.

Córdoba was a center of scholarship when the Umayyad Caliphate was in control of al-Andalus. Seville’s annexation of Córdoba in 1058 and academics fleeing from Toledo after Alfonso VI’s conquest of it in 1085, led to it having the reputation of being the pinnacle of al-Andalusian culture. A myriad of scientists are noted to have lived in Seville, like the astronomer al-Zarqali who created an improved astrolabe, and Ibn Bassal, an agronomist who tended to the royal gardens.

The city used to produce a variety of lusterware from the latter half of the 11th century. Several pieces of lusterware was found from the Ebro valley which indicated decorations found similar to ceramics made in the Taifa of Seville. These ceramics bear inscriptions to two Abbadid princes of Seville, who are identified by their proper names and titles. These production centers were operated under the authority of the Abbadid princes over several decades during the late 11th century. Among the products produced would have been glazed polychrome food serving vessels, such as bowls, platters, and pitchers. These would have been a staple of Islamic communal food service used for local residents of Seville.

== Relations with Christian kingdoms ==
The Taifa of Seville was one of many taifas to pay tribute to Christian kingdoms for protection and military support. The army size of the Taifas were recorded to be often small and so they relied on paying mercenaries and other Christian kings to support their military efforts. This increase in tribute led to a rise in taxation in Seville which resulted in the increasing unpopularity of al-Mu'tamid. Revolts occurred towards the end of his reign, and these events were likely an advantage to the Almoravids when they conquered the Taifa of Seville.

Along with monetary contributions, al-Mu'tamid would assist Alfonso VI by turning over his brother, Garcia, who was taking refuge in Seville. In exchange, al-Mu'tamid had access to Alfonso VI’s knights in his war against the Taifa of Granada, one of Seville’s greatest enemies. This alliance would not be strong, as al-Mu'tamid would fight against Alfonso VI with the Almoravids in the 1086 Battle of Sagrajas and later bargain for his support by offering his daughter-in-law to the Christian king in a marriage pact when Yusuf ibn Tashfin moved to conquer the taifa.

Taifas of the 11th century saw Christians and Muslims fight alongside each other, as would the Christian kingdoms to their north. Seville was no exception to this policy, relying on Christian mercenaries to bolster their forces. After the united Muslim Almoravids invaded al-Andalus, this occurrence would become less frequent.

== Legacy ==
While historians in the mid-20th century have painted a picture that the taifas, including Seville, were merely barbarians, modern historians have explained how they were geopolitically placed into positions where they had to be ruthlessly pragmatic to survive. Similar to the other taifas of the 11th century, the Taifa of Seville saw a sophistication in culture alongside state degradation. This taifa is an example of how the taifa kings would maneuver to unite al-Andalus under their own banner, but the infighting between the taifa kings would lead to their territories becoming unsustainable by 1085.

== See also ==
- Al-Andalus
- History of Islam
- History of Spain
- List of Sunni Muslim dynasties
