= Abbad II al-Mu'tadid =

Ruler of Seville, Al-Andalus, from 1042 to 1069

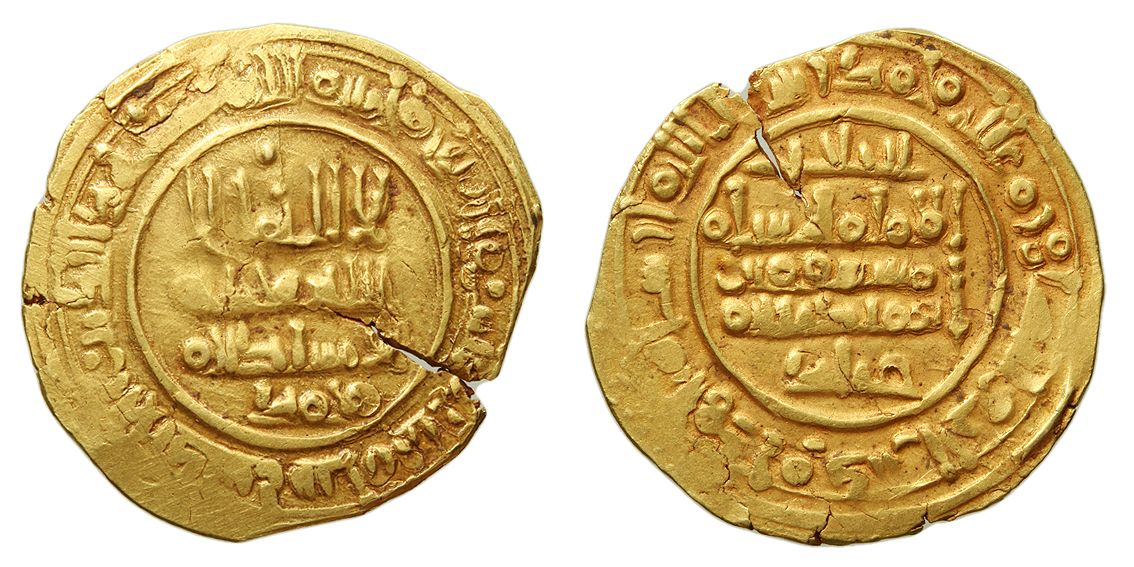
- Gold dinar issued by Al-Mu'tadid in A.H. 438

Emir of the Seville Taifa
- Reign: 1042–1069
- Predecessor: Abu al-Qasim Muhammad ibn Abbad
- Successor: Al-Mu'tamid ibn Abbad
- Born: Al-Andalus
- Died: 28 February 1069; Al-Andalus
- Burial: Al-Andalus
- Children: Mu'tamid (son)
Names
- Abu ʿAmr ʿAbbad II al-Muʿtadid (Arabic: المعتضد بالله أبو عمرو عبَّاد)
- Dynasty: Abbadid
- Father: Muhammad ibn Abbad
- Religion: Sunni Islam

Abu ʿAmr ʿAbbad II al-Muʿtadid (Arabic: المعتضد بالله أبو عمرو عبَّاد; died 28 February 1069), a member of the Abbadid dynasty, was the second independent emir of Seville (reigned 1042–1069) in Al-Andalus.

== Life ==
His father, Abu al-Qasim Muhammad ibn Abbad, had established the Taifa of Seville, and Abbad became its emir when Abu al-Qasim died in 1042. Among other acts of friendship, he authorized the transfer of Saint Isidore's relics from Seville to the Basilica of San Isidoro in León.

Al-Muʿtadid expanded his territory by conquering numerous Islamic taifas (independent principalities), including those of Mértola (1044–45), Huelva (1051), Algeciras (1055), Ronda (1065) and Arcos (1069). He also fought against the Zirids of Granada and the Aftasids of Badajoz, but with no conclusive results. In 1063, when Ferdinand I appeared with an army on the outskirts of Seville, Al-Muʿtadid was forced to acknowledge his suzerainty and to pay him tribute.

Al-Muʿtadid died in 1069 and was succeeded by his son, al-Mu'tamid ibn Abbad.

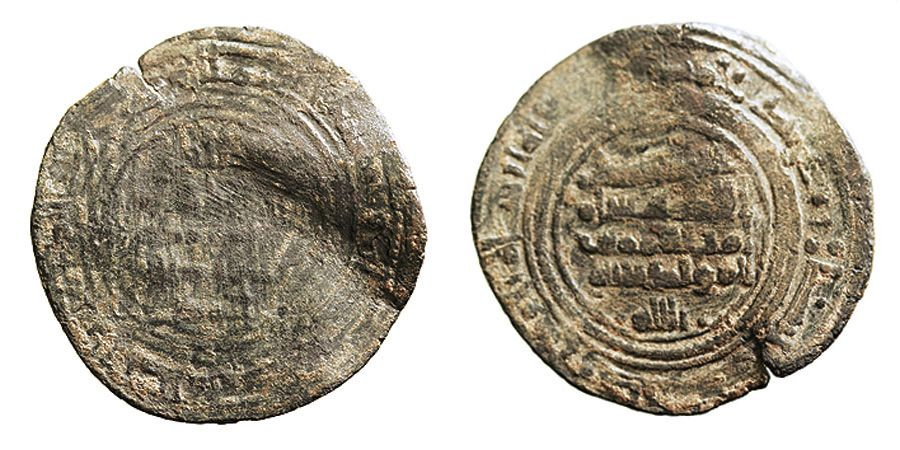
Billon dirham of Abbad II al-Mu'tadid, dated AH 439 (AD 1047/48).

== Historical treatment ==
In historiography, Al-Mu'tadid would develop an infamous reputation, with many accounts depicting him as a scheming and morally unscrupulous figure. Various stories from his reign are centered on his displays of paranoid and sadistic behavior. Although he dedicated much of his reign to waging wars of aggrandizement, he was said to have rarely ventured beyond the safety of the walls and towers of his "lair", the fortified Alcázar of Seville. In 1053, he received a delegation Berber princes from Ronda at the Alcázar, where he invited them into his steam bath. Once they were inside, Al-Mu'tadid had its entrances sealed and all openings plugged, suffocating his guests. Al-Mu'tadid also ordered the death of one of his own sons, an act which, according to some accounts, he carried out personally. Even darker legends claim that Al-Mu'tadid kept and collected the heads of his enemies or others who had run afoul of him. Al-Mu'tadid was said to have kept the skulls of princes in specially-made chests, while those of lower birth were repurposed into macabre flower-pots.

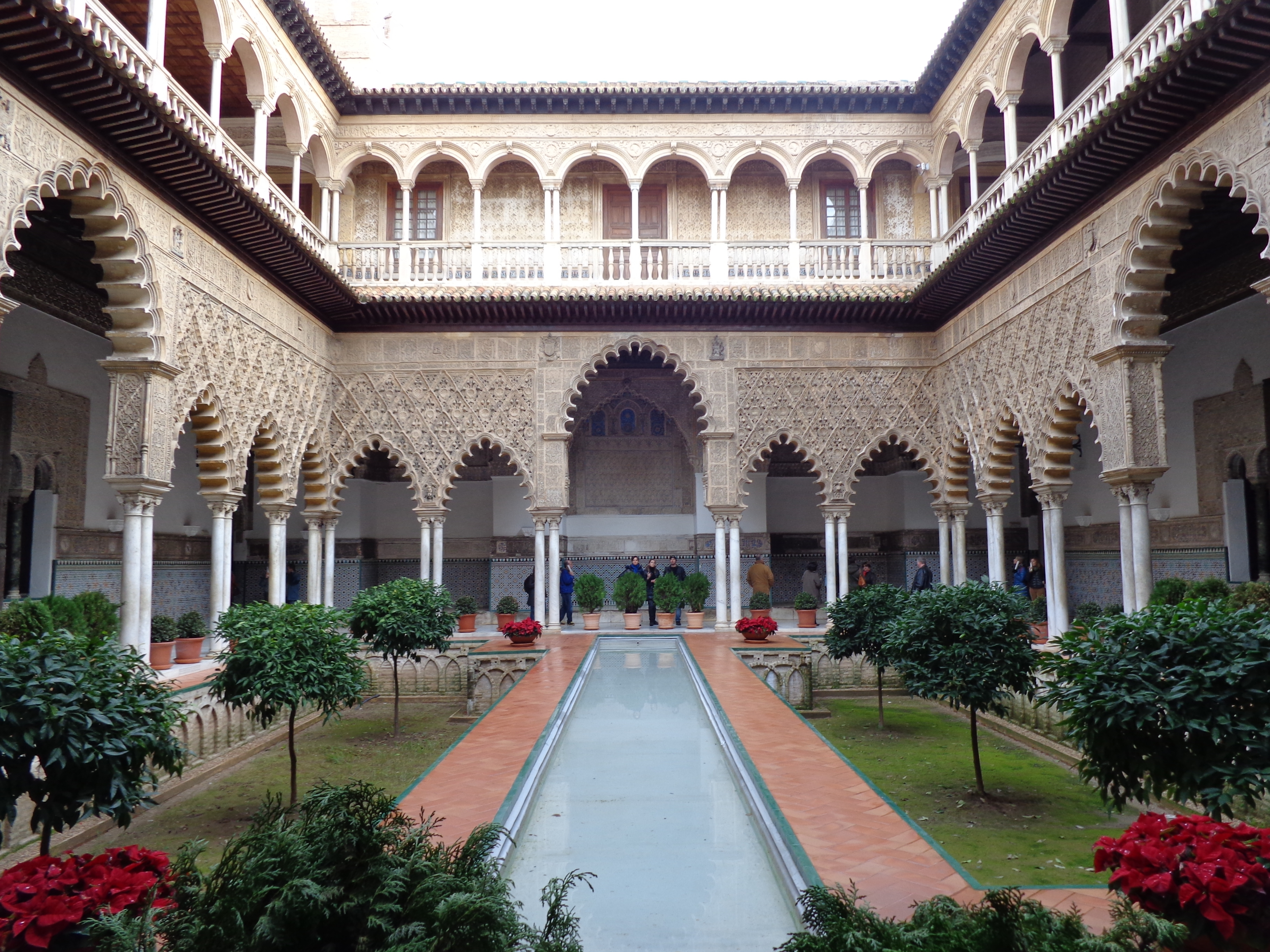
Interior courtyard of the Alcázar of Seville.

Despite his capacity for cruelty, Al-Mu'tadid is noted for his cultural sophistication and tolerant attitude towards the Christians of his realm. He initially had amicable relations with his neighbor Ferdinand I, Count of Castile and King of León, and tolerated the Christian faith in his own lands. Among other acts of friendship, he authorized the transfer of Saint Isidore's relics from Seville to the Basilica of San Isidoro in León. Al-Mu'tadid was also known for cultivation in arts and letters and love of poetry. According to the historian David McDowall Hannay, "he had a striking resemblance to the Italian princes of the later middle ages and early renaissance". Unusual for an Islamic sovereign, Al-Mu'tadid was said to have indulged in drinking wine.

== Sources ==
- Ulrich Haarmann, Heinz Halm, ed. (2001). Geschichte der Arabischen Welt. Munich: C.H. Beck.

Preceded by Abu al-Qasim Muhammad ibn Abbad	Abbadid emir of Seville; 1042–1069	Succeeded by al-Mu'tamid ibn Abbad
