= List of Sunni dynasties =

The following is a list of Sunni dynasties.

== Asia ==
=== Arabian Peninsula ===
- Ziyadid dynasty (819–1018)
- Wajihids (926–965)
- Sulaymanids (1063–1174)
- Mahdids (1159–1174)
- Kathiri (Hadhramaut) (1395–1967)
- Jabrids (1417–1521)
- Banu Khalid (1669–1796)
- Al Qasimi (Sharjah) (18th century–present)
- Al Qasimi (Ras al Khaymah) (1727–present)
- House of Saud (Saudi Arabia) (1744–present)
- House of Sabah (Kuwait) (1752–present)
- House of Nahyan (Abu Dhabi) (1761–present)
- Al Mualla (Umm al-Quwain) (1775–present)
- House of Khalifa (Bahrain) (1783–present)
- House of Al Falasi - branch of the House of Maktoum (Dubai) (1833–present)
- Rashidi dynasty (Arabian Peninsula) (1836–1921)
- House of Thani (Qatar) (1851–present)

=== Iraq/Iran and Caucasus ===
- Dulafid dynasty (early 9th century–897)
- Samanid dynasty (819–999)
- Tahirid dynasty (821–873)
- Saffarid dynasty (861–1003)
- Sajid dynasty (889–929)
- Farighunid (late 9th–early 11th centuries)
- Ma'danid dynasty (late 9th–11th centuries)
- Hadhabani (906–1063)
- Sallarid dynasty (942–979)
- Shaddadids (951–1199)
- Rawwadid dynasty (955–1116)
- Annazids (990–1116)
- Seljuk dynasty (11th–14th centuries)
- Hazaraspids (1115–1425)
- Khorshidi dynasty (1155–1597)
- Mihrabanids (1236–1537)
- Muzaffarids (1335–1393)
- Baban (16th century–1850)
- Mamluk dynasty (1704–1831)

=== Central Asia ===
- Ghurid dynasty (879–1215)
- Muhtajids (10th–early 11th centuries)
- Ghaznavids (977–1187)
- Kart dynasty (1231–1389)
- Timurid dynasty (1370–1857)
- Shaybanids (1428–1599)
- Janid dynasty (1599–1785)
- Hotaki dynasty (1709–1738)
- Durrani dynasty (1747–1823)
- Manghud (1785–1920)
- Barakzai dynasty (1826–1973)

=== Asia Minor (Modern Turkey) ===
- Marwanids (983–1100)
- Artuqids (1102–1409)
- House of Mengüjek (1071–1277)
- Chobanids (1227–1309)
- Candar dynasty (1292–1461)
- Karamanids (c. 1250–1487)
- Hamidids (c. 1280–1374)
- Germiyan dynasty (1299–1428)
- Ottoman dynasty (1299–1923)
- Teke (1301–1423)
- Sarukhanids (1302–1410)
- Karasid dynasty (1303–1360)
- Aydinids (1307–1425)

=== Levant region ===
- Burid dynasty (1104–1154)
- Zengid dynasty (1127–1250)
- Shihab dynasty (1176–1842)
- Hashemites (1916–present)

=== South Asia ===
- Ma'danid dynasty (10th–11th century)
- Theemuge dynasty (1166–1388)
- Khalji dynasty (Bengal) (1204–1231)
- Mamluk dynasty (Delhi) (1206–1290)
- Khalji dynasty (Delhi) (1290–1320)
- Tughlaq dynasty (1320–1414)
- Samma dynasty (1335–1520)
- Mubarak Shahi dynasty (1338–1352)
- Ilyas Shahi dynasty (1342–1487)
- Shah Mir dynasty (1339–1561)
- Farooqui dynasty (1382–1601)
- Hilaalee dynasty (Maldives) (1388–1558)
- Muzaffarids (1391–1583)
- House of Ganesha (1414–1436)
- Sayyid dynasty of Delhi (1414–1451)
- Lodi dynasty (1451–1526)
- Arghun dynasty (1520–1554)
- Hussain Shahi dynasty (1494–1538)
- Mughal dynasty (1526–1857)
- Katoor dynasty (1560–1969)
- Karrani dynasty (1564–1576)
- Utheemu dynasty (Maldives) (1632–1692)
- Isdhoo dynasty (Maldives) (1692–1704)
- Dhiyamigili dynasty (Maldives) (1704–1759)
- Rohilla dynasty (1721–1947)
- Sial dynasty (1723–1816)
- Nawab of Bhopal (1723–1947)
- Asaf Jah dynasty, Nizam of Hyderabad (1724–1948)
- Babi dynasty (1735–1947)
- Huraa dynasty (Maldives) (1759–1968)

=== Southeast Asia ===
- House of Bolkiah (1363–present)
- Bendahara dynasty (1699–present)
- House of Opu Daeng Chelak (1745–present)
- Hamengkubuwono (1755–present)
- House of Long Yunus (1763–present)
- Royal house of Sulu (1823–present)
- House of Jamalullail (1843–present)
- House of Temenggong (1886–present)

== Africa ==
=== North Africa ===
- Muhallabids (771–793)
- Idrisid dynasty (788–974)
- Aghlabid dynasty (800–909)
- Sulaymanid dynasty (814–922)
- Tulunids (868–905)
- Ikhshidid dynasty (935–969)
- Zirid dynasty (973–1148)
- Banu Khazrun (1001–1146)
- Hammadid dynasty (1008–1152)
- Almoravid dynasty (1040–1147)
- Ayyubid dynasty (1171–1341)
- Hafsid dynasty (1229–1574)
- Nasrid dynasty (1232–1492)
- Ziyyanid dynasty (1235–1556)
- Bahri Mamluks (1250–1382)
- Marinid dynasty (1269–1465)
- Banu Khurman (1300–1551)
- Banu Thabit (1327–1406)
- Wattasid dynasty (1472–1554)
- Awlad Muhammad (1551–1812)
- Alawi dynasty (1666–present)
- Husainid dynasty (1705–1957)
- Karamanli dynasty (1711–1835)
- Muhammad Ali dynasty (1805–1952)

=== Horn of Africa ===
- Walashma dynasty (1197–1559)
- Mudaito dynasty (16th century–present)
- House of Guled (1750–1884)
- Reer Caynaashe (18th century–1884)

=== Central and West Africa ===
- Za dynasty (11th century–1275)
- Sayfawa dynasty (1075–1846)
- Keita dynasty (1235–c. 1670)
- Sonni dynasty c. 1464–1493
- Askiya dynasty (1493–1591)

== Europe ==
=== Eastern Europe and Russia ===
- Bushati family (1757–1831)

=== Spain and Portugal ===
- Amirids (976–1002)
- Hammudid dynasty (1016–1058)
- Abbadid dynasty (1023–1090)
- Banu Hud (1039–1110)
- Banu Sumadih (1041–1051)
- Banu Tujib (1041–1090)
- Banu Ghaniya (1126–1203)

== See also ==
- List of Shia dynasties
- List of Muslim states and dynasties
