= Andalusi Romance =

Medieval Romance dialects of Al-Andalus

- Mozarabic
- Region: Al-Andalus
- Ethnicity: Mozarabs
- Extinct: by the Late Middle Ages
- Language family: Indo-European: Italic; Latino-Faliscan; Latinic; Romance; Italo-Western; Western Romance; (disputed); Pyrenean–Mozarabic?; Andalusi Romance
- Writing system: Arabic; Hebrew

Language codes
- ISO 639-3: mxi
- Glottolog: moza1249
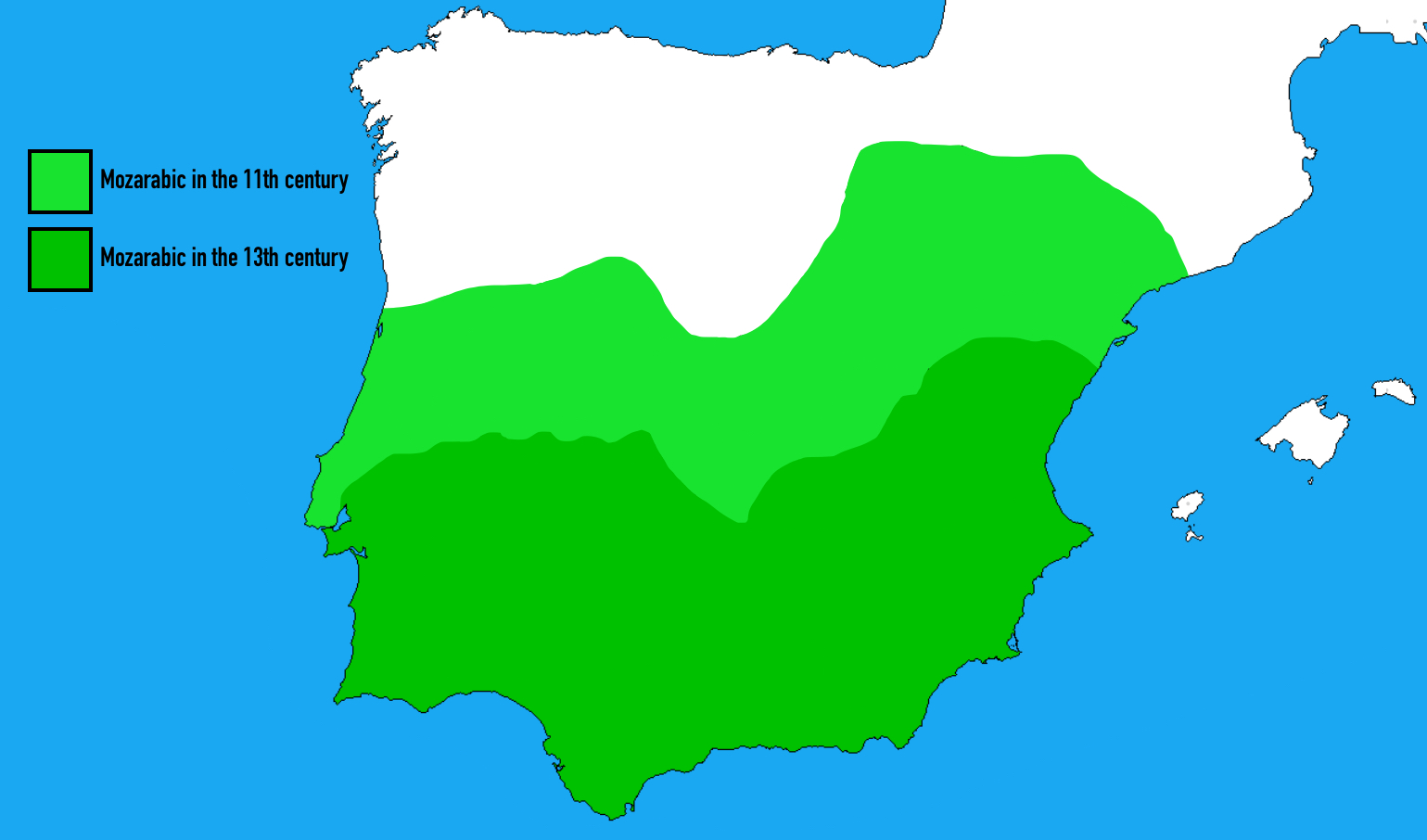
- (Maximal) extent of Andalusi Romance in the 11th and 13th centuries

Andalusi Romance, also called Mozarabic, (Note: From Mozarab, from the Arabic: مستعرب, romanized: musta‘rab, lit. 'Arabized', a term used to refer to Christians in al-Andalus. Despite being called Mozarabic, the local Romance vernaculars were spoken by Christians, Jews, and Muslims, and these Romance varieties—while having loanwords from Arabic—are not Arabic languages.) refers to the varieties of Ibero-Romance that were spoken in Al-Andalus, the parts of the medieval Iberian Peninsula under Islamic control. Romance, or vernacular Late Latin, was the common tongue for the great majority of the Iberian population at the time of the Umayyad conquest in the early eighth century, but over the following centuries, it was gradually superseded by Andalusi Arabic as the main spoken language in the Muslim-controlled south. At the same time, as the northern Christian kingdoms pushed south into Al-Andalus, their respective Romance varieties (especially Castilian) gained ground at the expense of Andalusi Romance as well as Arabic. The final extinction of the former may be estimated to 1300 AD.

Among the medieval Ibero-Romance languages, which were broadly similar to each other (with Castilian as something of an outlier), Andalusi Romance is distinguished not primarily by its linguistic features, but rather by its being written in the Arabic script (mainly, and Hebrew script otherwise). What is known or hypothesized about the particular linguistic features of Andalusi Romance is based on relatively sparse evidence, of which the kharjas, or closing lines of an Andalusi muwaššaḥ poem, are the most important.

== Names ==
The traditional term for the Romance varieties used in al-Andalus is "Mozarabic", derived from Mozarab (itself from the Arabic: مُسْتَعْرَب, romanized: musta‘rab, lit. 'Arabized'), a term used to refer to Arabized Christians in al-Andalus. (Note: Mozarab (Spanish: mozárabes [moˈθaɾaβes]; Portuguese: moçárabes [muˈsaɾɐβɨʃ]; Catalan: mossàrabs [muˈsaɾəps]; from Arabic: مُسْتَعْرَب, romanized: musta‘rab, lit. 'Arabized') is first documented in Christian sources from the 11th century; the term Mozarab was not used by Muslims to describe Christians. Contemporary Arabic sources described Christians as naṣārā (نصارى 'Nazarenes'), or imprecisely by their legal-religious status: ahl adh-dhimma (أهل الذمة 'people of the covenant') or mu‘āhidūn (معاهدون 'contractual partners'). The term Mozarab, now sometimes applied broadly to all Christians in al-Andalus, is imprecise; many Christians living in Islamic Spain resisted Arabization, for example.) In the context of medieval Iberia, the term is first documented in Christian sources from the 11th century; it was not used by Muslims to describe Christians.

Some scholars dislike the term for its ambiguity. According to Consuelo Lopez-Morillas:

It has been objected that the term straddles ambiguously the realms of religion and language, and further implies, erroneously, that the dialect was spoken only by Christians. The very form of the word suggests (again a false perception) that it denotes a language somehow related to Arabic.

To describe the varieties of Romance in al-Andalus, Spanish scholars are increasingly using romance andalusí (from the Arabic: أَنْدَلُسِيّ, romanized: andalusī, lit. 'of al-Andalus'), or Andalusi Romance in English.

Speakers of Andalusi Romance, like speakers of Romance anywhere else on the peninsula, would have described their spoken language simply as "ladino", i.e. Latin. The term Ladino has since come to have the specialized sense of Judeo-Spanish. (Note: This coincides with the Italian name for the Ladin language, a Rhaeto-Romance language spoken in northern Italy.) Arab writers used the terms al-Lathinī or al-'ajamīya (Note: Leonard Patrick Harvey writes that: Although the word aljamia is attested as early as the fifteenth century in Portuguese in its broad sense, in the restricted technical sense in which it occurs in the title of this paper, it probably entered the language from Spanish in the course of the nineteenth century. The older, broader sense of the word in both Portuguese and Spanish was 'Romance vernacular', but it was only used by Muslims speaking of that vernacular, or by Christians speaking of the use of Romance by Muslims: it would not be used by a Christian in a purely Christian context.) (العَجَمِيَّة, from ʿajam, 'non-Arab') or Ajami.

== History ==
Romance was the main language spoken by the population of Iberia when the Umayyads conquered Hispania in 711. Under Muslim rule, Arabic became a superstrate prestige language and would remain the dominant vehicle of literature, high culture, and intellectual expression in Iberia for five centuries (8th–13th).

Over the centuries, Arabic spread gradually in Al-Andalus, primarily through conversion to Islam. While Alvarus of Cordoba lamented in the 9th century that Christians were no longer using Latin, Richard Bulliet estimates that only 50% of the population of al-Andalus had converted to Islam by the death of Abd al-Rahman III in 961, and 80% by 1100. By about 1260, Muslim territories in Iberia were reduced to the Emirate of Granada, in which more than 90% of the population had converted to Islam and Arabic-Romance bilingualism seems to have disappeared.

== Documents ==
What is known or hypothesized of the particular linguistic features of Andalusi Romance is based on relatively sparse evidence, including Romance topographical and personal names, legal documents from the Mozarabs of Toledo, names in botanical texts, occasional isolated romance words in the zajal poetry of Ibn Quzman, and Pedro de Alcalá's Vocabulista.

Samuel Miklos Stern's rediscovery in the late 1940s of Romance present in some of the kharjas, the final verses in muwashshah poetry otherwise written in Arabic and Hebrew, illuminated some morphological and syntactic features of Andalusi Romance, including sentence rhythms and phrasal patterns.

== Influences ==
Other than the obvious Arabic influence, and remnants of a pre-Roman substratum, early Mozarabic may also have been affected by African Romance, which would have been carried over to the Iberian Peninsula by the Berbers who made up most of the Islamic army that conquered it and remained prominent in the Andalusi administration and army for centuries to come. The possible interaction between these two Romance varieties has yet to be investigated.

== Scripts ==
Because Mozarabic was not a language of higher culture, such as Latin or Arabic, it had no standard writing system. Numerous Latin documents written by early Mozarabs are, however, extant.

The bulk of surviving material in Mozarabic is found in the choruses (or kharjas) of Andalusi lyrical compositions known as muwashshahs, which were otherwise written in Arabic. The script used to write the Mozarabic kharjas was invariably Arabic or Hebrew, less often the latter. This poses numerous problems for modern scholars attempting to interpret the underlying Mozarabic. Namely:

- Arabic script:
  - did not reliably indicate vowels
  - relied on diacritical points, quite often lost or distorted when copying manuscripts, to distinguish the following series of consonants: b-t-ṯ-n-y; (Note: N and y were, however, distinct word-finally.) ğ-ḥ-ḫ; d-ḏ; r-z; s-s̆; ṣ-ḍ; ṭ-ẓ; '-ġ; f-q; and h-a (word-finally)
  - rendered the following consonants in similar ways: r-w-d, ḏ; '-l-k (word-initially); ', ġ-f, q-m (word-initially and medially); n-y (word-finally)
  - had no specific means to indicate the following Romance sounds: /p, v (β), ts, dz, s̺, z̺, tʃ, ʎ, ɲ, e, o/
- Hebrew script:
  - also did not reliably indicate vowels
  - rendered the following consonants in similar ways: r-d; g-n; y-w; k-f; s-m (word-finally)

The overall effect of this, combined with the rampant textual corruption, is that modern scholars can freely substitute consonants and insert vowels to make sense of the kharjas, leading to considerable leeway, and hence inaccuracy, in interpretation.

== Phonological features ==
It is widely agreed that Mozarabic had the following features:

- The diphthongs /au̯, ai̯/, the latter possibly changed to /ei̯/
- Diphthongization of stressed Latin /ŏ, ĕ/
- Palatalization and affrication of Latin /k/ before front vowels to /tʃ/
- Retention of Latin /j/ before front vowels
- Shift of the feminine plural /-as/ to /-es/

The following two features remain a matter of debate, largely due to the ambiguity of the Arabic script:

- Palatalization of Latin /nn, ll/ to /ɲ, ʎ/
- Lenition of intervocalic Latin /p t k s/ to /b d ɡ z/
  - Much of the controversy over the voicing of Latin /p t k/ has centered on the Arabic letters Qāf and Ṭāʾ, which in fact had both voiced and voiceless pronunciations in different varieties of Arabic. It is likely that both pronunciations were found in the Iberian Peninsula.
  - Ramón Menéndez Pidal has shown (sporadic) evidence of voicing in Latin inscriptions from the south of the Iberian Peninsula in the second century AD.
  - There are a few cases of original Latin /t k/ being represented with indisputably voiced consonants in Arabic, like [ɣ], [d], and [ð].

== Sample text ==
Presented below is one of the few kharjas whose interpretation is secure from beginning to end. It has been transcribed from a late thirteen-century copy in Hebrew script, but it is also attested (in rather poor condition) in an Arabic manuscript from the early twelfth century.

Transcription	Interpretation	Translation
ky fr'yw 'w ky s̆yr'd dmyby ḥbyby nwn tyṭwlgs̆ dmyby	ke farayo aw ke s̆erad de mibe, habībī? non te twelgas̆ de mibe.	What shall I do, or what shall become of me, my friend? Don't take yourself from me.

Another kharja is presented below, transcribed from Arabic script by García Gómez:

Transcription	Interpretation	Translation
mw sīdī 'ibrāhīm y' nw'mn dlŷ f'nt myb ḏy njt in nwn s̆ nwn k'rs̆ yrym tyb grmy 'wb 'frt	Mew sīdī 'Ibrāhīm, yā nuēmne dolz̊e, fēn-te mīb dē nojte. In nōn, si nōn kērís̆, yirē-me tīb —gar-me 'a 'ob!— a fer-te.	My lord Ibrahim, oh [what a] sweet name, come to me at night. If not, if you do not want to, I will go to you —tell me where!— to see you.

However the above kharja, like most others, presents numerous textual difficulties. Below is Jones's transcription of it, with vowels inserted and uncertain readings italicized. Note the discrepancies.

Transcription	Possible emendations
fən sīdi ibrāhīm yā nwāmni dalji fānta mīb ḏī nuxti in nūn s̆i-nūn kāris̆ f/bīrīmə tīb gar mī <a> ūb ləgar-ti	mū sīdi ibrāhīm - - - - f-īrīmə tīb gari mi ūb -

== See also ==
- Aljamiado
- Mozarabs
- Mozarabic Rite
- Mozarabic art and architecture
- Andalusian Arabic
- History of Portugal
- History of Spain

== Bibliography ==
- Corriente Córdoba, Federico; Sáenz-Badillos, Ángel (1994). "Nueva propuesta de lectura de las xarajât de la serie árabe con texto romance". Revista de Filología Española. 73 (3–4): 283–289. doi:10.3989/rfe.1994.v74.i3/4.456.
- Craddock, Jerry R. (1980). "The language of the Mozarabic jarchas". UC Berkeley Research Center for Romance Studies.
- Craddock, Jerry R. (2002). "Mozarabic Language". In Gerli, E. Michael; Armistead, Samuel G. (eds.). Medieval Iberia: An Encyclopedia. London: Routledge. doi:10.4324/9781315161594. ISBN 978-0415939188. OCLC 50404104.
- Galmés de Fuentes, Alvaro (1983). Dialectología mozárabe. Madrid: Gredos. ISBN 978-8424909161.
- García Gómez, Emilio (1965). Las jarchas romances de la serie árabe en su marco (in Spanish). Madrid: Sociedad de Estudios y Publicaciones.
- Gil, Juan (1973). Corpus scriptorum muzarabicorum. Vol. 1–2. Madrid: CSIC.
- Jones, Alan (1988). Romance kharjas in Andalusian Arabic muwaššaḥ poetry. London: Ithaca Press. ISBN 0863720854.
- Marcos-Marín, Francisco A. (1998). "Romance andalusí y mozárabe: Dos términos no sinónimos". In Andrés Suárez, Irene; López Molina, Luis (eds.). Estudios de Lingüística y Filología Españolas: Homenaje a Germán Colón. Madrid: Gredos. pp. 335–341.
- Marcos Marín, Francisco (2015). "Notas sobre los bereberes, el afrorrománico y el romance andalusí". Hesperia: Culturas del Mediterráneo. 19: 203–222.
- Menéndez Pidal, Ramón (2005). Historia de la lengua española. Vol. 1–2. Madrid: Fundación Ramón Menendez Pidal. ISBN 84-89934-11-8.
- Penny, Ralph J. (2000). Variation and change in Spanish. Cambridge: Cambridge University Press. doi:10.1017/CBO9781139164566. ISBN 0521780454.
- Wright, Roger (1982). Late Latin and Early Romance in Spain and Carolingian France. Liverpool: Francis Cairns. ISBN 0-905205-12-X.
- Zamora Vicente, Alonso (1967). Dialectología española (2nd ed.). Madrid: Biblioteca Romanica Hispanica, Editorial Gredos. ISBN 9788424911157.
