= List of Umayyad rulers =

This is a list of the rulers of the Umayyad dynasty, which was a branch of Quraysh tribe descended from Umayya ibn Abd Shams.

== Umayyad caliphs (661–750) ==
No.	Coin (Note: Before Abd al-Malik's introduction of Islamic coinage, caliphs continued using Byzantine and Sasanian coins, albeit with slight modifications, such as Bismillah and the caliph's name and title of Amir al-Mu'minin.)	Name (Note: Unlike the later Abbasids, known by their regnal laqabs, Umayyad caliphs lack such titles. Islamic historiography instead refers to them by the given name and patronym, while Western historiography instead uses given name and regnal number.)	Reign	Parents	Life details
Sufyanids (661–684)
1		Mu'awiya I أبو عبد الرحمن معاوية بن أبي سفيان; Abū ʿAbd al-Raḥmān Muʿāwiya ibn Abī Sufyān	28 July 661 – 29 April 680 (~19 years)	Abu Sufyan ibn Harb; Hind bint Utba	597-605 – 29 April 680 (aged 75–83): Became caliph after a Treaty with Hasan ibn Ali.; Damascus becomes the capital of the Caliphate.; First Siege of Constantinople (674).; Conquest of Ifriqiya by Uqba ibn Nafi.
2		Yazid I أبو خالد يزيد بن معاوية; Abū Khālid Yazīd ibn Muʿāwiya	27 April 680 – 11 November 683 (~3 years)	Mu'awiya I; Maysun bint Bahdal	646 – 11 November 683 (aged 37): Heir of Mu'awiya I; first dynastic succession in caliphate's history.; Husayn ibn Ali's death (680); start of Second Fitna.; Rival caliphate of Ibn al-Zubayr (683).; Sieges of Mecca and Medina (683).
3		Mu'awiya II أبو يزيد معاوية بن يزيد; Abū Yazīd Muʿāwiya ibn Yazīd	11 November 683 – June 684 (~7 months)	Yazid I; Fakhitah bint Abi Hisham	664 – June 684 (aged 20): Heir apparent of Yazid I; nominal rule ending in his early death.
Marwanids (684–750)
4		Marwan I أبو عبد الملك مروان بن الحكم; Abū ʿAbd al-Malik Marwān ibn al-Ḥakam	June 684 – 12 April 685 (~10 months)	al-Hakam ibn Abi al-As; Amina bint Alqama	623/626 – 12 April 685 (aged 59–63): Elected by loyalists due to the youth of Yazid's sons.; Secured Syria for Umayyads (684); recovered Egypt from the Zubayrids.
5		Abd al-Malik أبو الوليد عبد الملك بن مروان; Abū al-Walīd ʿAbd al-Malik ibn Marwān	12 April 685 – 8 October 705 (~20 years)	Marwan I; A'isha bint Mu'awiya	July 644/647 – 8 October 705 (aged 58–61): Death of ibn al-Zubayr, Umayyad victory in the Second Fitna (692).; Dome of the Rock constructed (691).; Arabic made official language; Islamic coinage introduced.; Fall of Carthage (698); conquest of Ifriqiya (701).
6		al-Walid I أبو العباس الوليد بن عبد الملك; Abū al-ʿAbbās al-Walīd ibn ʿAbd al-Malik	8 October 705 – 23 February 715 (~9 years)	Abd al-Malik; Wallada bint al-Abbas	July 674 – 23 February 715 (aged 41): First heir of Abd al-Malik.; Conquests of Maghreb (709), Hispania (711), Sindh and Transoxiana (712).; Umayyad Mosque constructed (715).
7		Sulayman أبو أيوب سليمان بن عبد الملك; Abū Ayyūb Sulaymān ibn ʿAbd al-Malik	23 February 715 – 22 September 717 (~2 years)	Abd al-Malik; Wallada bint al-Abbas	675 – 22 September 717 (aged 42): Second heir of Abd al-Malik.; Second Siege of Constantinople (717).
8		Umar II أبو حفص عمر بن عبد العزيز; Abū Ḥafṣ ʿUmar ibn ʿAbd al-ʿAzīz	22 September 717 – 4 February 720 (~2 years)	Abd al-Aziz ibn Marwan; Layla bint Asim	680 – 4 February 720 (aged 40): First heir of Sulayman.; Maternal great-grandson of Umar I.; Ended the Siege of Constantinople.; Ended jizya collection from non-Arab Muslim converts.; Revered in Islamic historiography as a righteous caliph.
9		Yazid II أبو خالد يزيد بن عبد الملك; Abū Khālid Yazīd ibn ʿAbd al-Malik	4 February 720 – 26 January 724 (~4 years)	Abd al-Malik; Atika bint Yazid I	690/691 – 26 January 724 (aged 33–34): Second heir of Sulayman.; Maternal grandson of Yazid I.; Largely reversed Umar II's reforms.; Resumed warfare against the Khazars.
10		Hisham أبو الوليد هشام بن عبد الملك; Abū al-Walīd Hishām ibn ʿAbd al-Malik	26 January 724 – 6 February 743 (~19 years)	Abd al-Malik; A'isha bint Hisham	691 – 6 February 743 (aged 52): Named first heir by Yazid II.; Defeats at Tolouse (721) and Tours (732); end of expansion into Europe.; Setbacks against Khazars (730) and Byzantines (740).; Berber Revolt (740); independence of Maghreb from the caliphate.
11		al-Walid II أبو العباس الوليد بن يزيد; Abū al-ʿAbbās al-Walīd ibn Yazīd	6 February 743 – 17 April 744 (~1 year)	Yazid II; Umm al-Hajjaj bint Muhammad	709 – 17 April 744 (aged 35): Named second heir by Yazid II.; Alienated elites with his dissolute lifestyle.; Overthrown and killed by Yazid III.
12		Yazid III أبو إبراهيم يزيد بن الوليد; Abū Ibrāhīm Yazīd ibn al-Walīd	17 April 744 – 4 October 744 (~6 months)	al-Walid I; Shah-i Afrid, a Persian princess	701 – 4 October 744 (aged 43): Overthrew his cousin; Third Fitna begins (744).; Pledged to govern based on shura.; Died of a brain tumor.
13		Ibrahim أبو إسحاق إبراهيم بن الوليد; Abū Isḥāq Ibrāhīm ibn al-Walīd	4 October 744 – 4 December 744 (~2 months)	al-Walid I; Su'ar/Budayra, concubine	d. January 750: Succeeded his brother Yazid III admist the ongoing Third Fitna.; Forced to abdicate after his forces were defeated by Marwan II.; Executed after Abbasid takeover (750).
14		Marwan II أبو عبد الملك مروان بن محمد; Abū ʿAbd al-Malik Marwān ibn Muḥammad	4 December 744 – 25 January 750 (~5 years)	Muhammad ibn Marwan; Rayya/Taruba, concubine	691 – 6 August 750 (aged 59): Grandson of Marwan I; usurped Ibrahim.; Abbasid revolution escalates (747); Defeated by Abbasids (750); fled to Egypt, where he was executed.

== Umayyad rulers of Córdoba (756–1031) ==
No.	Coin	Name (Note: The caliphs of Cordoba adopted the custom of using regnal titles from Abbasids, and are referred to by their given name and regnal title in Islamic historiography.)	Reign	Parents	Notable Events
Emirs of Córdoba (756–929)
1		Abd al-Rahman I أبو المطرف عبد الرحمن الداخل بن معاوية; Abū'l-Muṭarrif ʿAbd al-Raḥmān al-Dākhil ibn Muʿāwiya	15 May 756 – 30 September 788 (~32 years)	Mu'awiya ibn Hisham; Raha, Berber concubine	7 March 731 – 30 September 788 (aged 57): Grandson of caliph Hisham; Survived Abbasid purges; fled to Al-Andalus.; Consolidated rule by defeating Fihrids.; Repelled an Abbasid invasion (763); Mosque of Córdoba constructed (787).
2		Hisham I أبو الوليد هشام بن عبد الرحمن; Abū'l-Walīd Hishām ibn ʿAbd al-Raḥmān	6 October 788 – 16 April 796 (~7 years)	Abd al-Rahman I; Halul	757 – 16 April 796 (aged 38): Son and heir of Abd al-Rahman I.
3		al-Hakam I أبو العاص الحكم بن هشام; Abū'l-ʿĀṣ al-Ḥakam ibn Hishām	16 April 796 – 21 May 822 (~26 years)	Hisham I; Zokhrouf	771 – 21 May 822 (aged 51): Second son and heir of Hisham I.; Suppressed rebellions in Toledo (797) and Córdoba (806, 818).
4		Abd al-Rahman II أبو المطرف عبد الرحمن المتوسط بن الحكم; Abū'l-Muṭarrif ʿAbd al-Raḥmān al-Mutawassiṭ ibn al-Ḥakam	21 May 822 – 852 (~30 years)	al-Hakam I	792 – 852 (aged 60): Exiles from al-Hakam I's reign conquer Crete (824/827).; Viking raid Seville and Córdoba (844).; Executions of the martyrs of Córdoba.
5		Muhammad I أبو عبد الله محمد بن عبد الرحمن; Abū ʿAbd Allāh Muḥammad ibn ʿAbd al-Raḥmān	852 – 886 (~14 years)	Abd al-Rahman II; Nahtiz	823 – 886 (aged 63): Executions of the martyrs of Córdoba.; Rebellion of Umar ibn Hafsun (882).
6		al-Mundhir أبو الحكم المنذر بن محمد; Abū'l-Ḥakam al-Munḏhir ibn Muḥammad	886 – 888 (~2 years)	Muhammad I; Athel	842 – 888 (aged 46): Died besieging Bobastro; possibly killed by his brother, Abd Allah.
7		Abdullah أبو محمد عبد الله بن محمد; Abū Muḥammad ʿAbd Allāh ibn Muḥammad	888 – 15 October 912 (~24 years)	Muhammad I; Ashar	844 – 15 October 912 (aged 68): Brother of al-Mundhir.; Loss of Umayyad authority due to rebellions.
8		Abd al-Rahman III أبو المطرف عبد الرحمن بن محمد; Abū'l-Muṭarrif ʿAbd al-Raḥmān ibn Muḥammad	16 October 912 – 17 January 929 (~16 years)	Muhammad ibn Abd Allah; Muzna	18 December 890 – 15 October 961 (aged 70): Grandson and heir of Abd Allah.; Subjugation of rebel lords; restoration of Umayyad rule.; Establishment of saqaliba, Slavic slave soldiers.; Umar ibn Hafsun's death (917); end of his rebellion (928).
Caliphs of Córdoba (929–1031)
1		Abd al-Rahman III أبو المطرف عبد الرحمن الناصر لدين الله بن محمد; Abū'l-Muṭarrif ʿAbd al-Raḥmān an-Nāṣir li-Dīn Allāh ibn Muḥammad	17 January 929 – 15 October 961 (~32 years)	Muhammad ibn Abd Allah; Muzna	18 December 890 – 15 October 961 (aged 70): Adopted the title of caliph against Fatimids and Abbasids (929).; Medinat al-Zahra constructed (936).
2		al-Hakam II أبو المطرف الحكم المستنصر بالله بن عبد الرحمن; Abū'l-Muṭarrif al-Ḥakam al-Mustanṣir bi-llāh ibn ʿAbd al-Raḥmān	15 October 961 – 16 October 976 (~15 years)	Abd al-Rahman III; Murjan	13 January 915 – 16 October 976 (aged 61): Heir of Abd al-Rahman III.; Launch of a massive translation movement.; War against Fatimids in Maghreb (974).
3		Hisham II أبو الوليد هشام المؤيد بالله بن الحكم; Abū'l-Walīd Hishām ibn al-Muʾayyad bi-llāh al-Ḥakam	16 October 976 – 15 February 1009 (~32 years)	Al-Hakam II; Subh	966 – 1013 (aged 47): Crowned as a child; reigned as a figurehead with de facto rule by Almanzor and then his son.; Almanzor's campaigns against Christian kingdoms.; Deposed by his cousin, Muhammad II.
4		Muhammad II أبو الوليد محمد المهدي بالله بن هشام; Abū al-Walīd Muḥammad al-Mahdī bi'llāh ibn Hishām	February 1009 (~1 month)	Hisham bin Abd al-Jabbar; Muzna	976 – 23 June 1010 (aged 34): Great-grandson of Abd al-Rahman III.; Usurped Hisham II; Andalusian civil war begins.; Defeated by Berber rebels.
5		Sulayman أبو أيوب سليمان المستعين بالله بن الحكم; Abū Ayyūb Sulaymān al-Mustaʿīn bi'llāh ibn al-Ḥakam	February 1009 – May 1010 (~1 year)	al-Hakam ibn Sulayman; Thabiya	965 – 23 June 1016 (aged 51): Great-grandson of Abd al-Rahman III; proclaimed caliph by rebels.; Captured Córdoba from Muhammad II.; Reinstalled Hisham II before usurping him; defeated by Muhammad II.
(4)		Muhammad II أبو الوليد محمد المهدي بالله بن هشام; Abū al-Walīd Muḥammad al-Mahdī bi'llāh ibn Hishām	May 1010 – June 1010 (~1 month)	Hisham bin Abd al-Jabbar; Muzna	976 – 23 June 1010 (aged 34): Defeated Sulayman with his saqaliba.; Abandoned by his soldiers after a defeat by Sulayman.; Arrested and executed by his vizier Wadih.
(3)		Hisham II أبو الوليد هشام المؤيد بالله بن الحكم; Abū'l-Walīd Hishām ibn al-Muʾayyad bi-llāh al-Ḥakam	23 July 1010 – 19 April 1013 (~3 years)	Al-Hakam II; Subh	966 – 1013 (aged 47): Reinstalled by Wadih as a titular ruler.; Fall of Córdoba to Sulayman; killed or escaped into exile.
(5)		Sulayman أبو أيوب سليمان المستعين بالله بن الحكم; Abū Ayyūb Sulaymān al-Mustaʿīn bi'llāh ibn al-Ḥakam	19 April 1013 – 23 June 1016 (~3 years)	al-Hakam ibn Sulayman; Thabiya	965 – 23 June 1016 (aged 51): Recaptured Cordoba with Berbers.; Executed after Hammudid capture of Córdoba.
Hammudid interregnum (1016–1018)
6		Abd al-Rahman IV عبد الرحمن المرتضى بالله بن محمد ʿAbd al-Raḥmān al-Murtaḍā bi-llāh ibn Muḥammad	1018 (~few days)	Muhammad ibn Abd al-Malik	d. 1018: Great-grandson of Abd al-Rahman III.; Proclaimed caliph by loyalists after Ali al-Nasir's assassination.; Killed in a campaign to capture Córdoba.
Hammudid interregnum (1018–1023)
7		Abd al-Rahman V أبو المطرَّف عبد الرحمن المستظهر بالله بن هشام; Abū'l-Muṭarrif ʿAbd al-Raḥmān al-Mustaẓhir bi-llāh ibn Hishām	1023 – 1024 (~47 days)	Hisham bin Abd al-Jabbar; Ghaia	1001 – 1024 (aged 23): Great-grandson of Abd al-Rahman III.; Chosen by Córdobans after al-Qasim's expulsion.; Deposed by a gruntled mob; executed soon after.
8		Muhammad III أبو عبد الرحمن محمد المستكفي بالله بن عبد الرحمن; Abū ʿAbd al-Raḥmān Muḥammad al-Mustakfī bi-llāh ibn ʿAbd al-Raḥmān	17 January 1024 – 26 May 1025 (~1 year)	Abd al-Rahman bin Ubayd Allah; Hawra	976 – 1025 (aged 49): Great-grandson of Abd al-Rahman III; chosen by Córdobans.; Fled Córdoba as plots to depose him surfaced; possibly killed.
Hammudid interregnum (1025–1026)
9		Hisham III أبو بكر هشام المعتد بالله بن محمد; Abū Bakr Hishām al-Muʿtad bi-llāh ibn Muḥammad	1027 – 1031 (~4 years)	Muhammad bin Abd al-Malik; Ateb	973 – 1036 (aged 63): Great-grandson of Abd al-Rahman III.; Chosen by Córdobans after Hammudid departure.; Deposed and exiled after riots due to his unpopular rule.; End of Córdoban state; al-Andalus collapses into Taifas.

== Genealogy ==
Family tree of Umayyad rulers, and their relationship to the Banu Hashim, the clan of Muhammad, the Alids, and Abbasids. Unless a separate year of death is given, the rulers ruled till death (or died soon after deposition).
Uthman, Rashidun Caliph
Umayyad Caliphs
Emirs of Córdoba
Caliphs of Córdoba

Abd Manaf
Abd Shams	Hashim d. 497
Umayya	Abd al-Muttalib d. 578
Harb	Abu al-As	Abdullah d. 570	Abu Talib d. 619	al-Abbas d. 653
Abu Sufyan d. 653	Affan	Al-Hakam d. 656	Muhammad d. 632	Ali r. 656–661	Abdullah d. 687
Mu'awiya I r. 661–680	Uthman r. 644–656	Marwan I r. 684–685	Alids	Abbasids r. 750–1258
Yazid I r. 680–683	Abd al-Malik r. 685–705	Abd al-Aziz d. 705	Muhammad d. 720
Mu'awiya II r. 683–684	Al-Walid I r. 705–715	Sulayman r. 715–717	Yazid II r. 720–724	Hisham r. 724–743	Umar II r. 717–720	Marwan II r. 744–750
Yazid III r. 744	Ibrahim r. 744, d. 750	Al-Walid II r. 743–744	Mu'awiya d. 737
Abd al-Rahman I r. 756–788
Hisham I r. 788–796
Al-Hakam I r. 796–822
Abd al-Rahman II r. 822–852
Muhammad I r. 852–886
Al-Mundhir r. 886–888	Abdullah r. 888–912
Muhammad
Abd al-Rahman III r. 912–961
Al-Hakam II r. 961–976	Abd al-Jabbar	Sulayman	Ubayd Allah	Abd al-Malik
Hisham II r. 976–1009, 1010–1013	Hisham	Al-Hakam	Abd al-Rahman	Muhammad
Muhammad II r. 1009, 1010	Abd al-Rahman V r. 1023–1024	Sulayman r. 1009–1010, 1013–1016	Muhammad III r. 1024–1025	Abd al-Rahman IV r. 1018	Hisham III r. 1027–1031, d. 1036

== Bibliography ==
- Watt, W. Montgomery (1986). "Kuraysh". Encyclopedia of Islam. Vol. V: Khe–Mahi (New ed.). Leiden and New York: Brill. ISBN 90-04-07819-3.
- Marsham, Andrew (2013). "The Architecture of Allegiance in Early Islamic Late Antiquity: The Accession of Mu'awiya in Jerusalem, ca. 661 CE". In Beihammer, Alexander; Constantinou, Stavroula; Parani, Maria (eds.). Court Ceremonies and Rituals of Power in Byzantium and the Medieval Mediterranean. Leiden and Boston: Brill. ISBN 978-90-04-25686-6.
- Morony, M. (1986). "Kisrā". In Bosworth, C. E.; van Donzel, E.; Lewis, B. & Pellat, Ch. (eds.). The Encyclopaedia of Islam, Second Edition. Volume V: Khe–Mahi. Leiden: E. J. Brill. ISBN 978-90-04-07819-2.
- Hinds, M. (1993). "Muʿāwiya I b. Abī Sufyān". In Bosworth, C. E.; van Donzel, E.; Heinrichs, W. P. & Pellat, Ch. (eds.). The Encyclopaedia of Islam, Second Edition. Volume VII: Mif–Naz. Leiden: E. J. Brill. ISBN 978-90-04-09419-2.
- Haldon, John F. (1990). Byzantium in the Seventh Century: The Transformation of a Culture. Revised Edition. Cambridge, United Kingdom: Cambridge University Press. ISBN 978-0521319171.
- Kennedy, Hugh (2007). The Great Arab Conquests: How the Spread of Islam Changed the World We Live In. Philadelphia, Pennsylvania: Da Capo Press. ISBN 978-0-306-81740-3.
