= Siege of Córdoba (1009–1013) =

Part of Fitna of al-Andalus

- Part of Fitna of al-Andalus
- The Iberian Peninsula in 1000 AD
Date	November 1010–May 1013
Location	Córdoba
Result	Berber victory: Sulayman ibn al-Hakam restored as Caliph of Córdoba; Sack and Destruction of Córdoba

Belligerents
Berbers	Caliphate of Córdoba

Commanders and leaders
Sulayman ibn al-Hakam; Zawi ibn Ziri; Ali ibn Hammud al-Nasir; Al-Qasim al-Ma'mun many others	Muhammad II of Córdoba †; Hisham II †; Wadih al-Siqlabi †

Casualties and losses
Unknown	Heavy, many killed or fled, city destroyed and sacked

The city of Córdoba in al-Andalus, under the rule of Umayyad Caliph Hisham II al-Hakam, was besieged by Berbers from November 1010 until May 1013, with the city beyond the Roman walls completely destroyed.

== Background ==
The death of caliph Al-Hakam II marked the demise of the last effective and powerful Umayyad ruler of Al-Andalus. Before his death, Al-Hakam had been careful to secure the succession to his only son, Hisham II. Hisham assumed the caliphate in 976 at the age of ten, under the guardianship of his mother, Subh of Córdoba, assisted by Almanzor. This latter raised in ranks from al-Hakam days proving formidable civilian and military capabilities, he eventually reached the title of Hajib.

Taking advantage of the weakness of the Umayyad rule, the Hajib marginalized influential figures like Subh, mother of Hisham, Almanzor assumed sole power as Hajib. He placed Hisham under house arrest preventing him from leaving the palace, which he had tightened its security, Hisham became a puppet ruler without power, his presence was limited to the coinage in his name, receiving homage in the Friday prayer, and to hold the title of caliph.

Almanzor was keen to strengthen his rule by attracting new generation of Berber mercenaries from the Maghreb to challenge the Arab military aristocracy and the Saqaliba pride, these Berbers were different from the old ones who came with Muslim conquest in the 8th century, as they were complete tribes directed by their own leaders, they formed the bulk of the caliphate of Córdoba army and its striking force, Almanzor ensured military superiority in the Iberian Peninsula over the Christian kingdoms in the North by waging holy war on them two times per year, thus strengthening his position as the supreme ruler of al-Andalus.

Despite military successes, the political situation inside the Muslim ruled "Al-Andalus" seemed to be in a state of turmoil, Berbers entered in conflict with Arabs and Andalusians (locals) for influence, and absence of caliph Hisham escalated the stress, Upon Al-Mansur's death, his son Abd al-Malik al-Muzaffar succeeded him as Hajib from 1002 until his death in 1008, his second son Abd al-Rahman Sanchuelo assumed power after that. He followed his father's approach and even forced Hisham al-Mu'ayyad to appoint him as his heir successor. The situation deteriorated, as the inheritance rules prevents a non-Umayyad to hold the title of Caliph, the Arab-Andalusian aristocracy and many living Umayyad descendents feared the development of influence of the Amirid house and their Berber supporters.

Sanchuelo set his army for a new expedition against the kingdom of León, being far enough from the unprotected Córdoba, the Córdobans with Muhammad II of Córdoba rose in rebellion against the Amirid regime, and attacked Córdoba, thus overthrowning Hisham II, and making Muhammad caliph, upon hearing the news, Abd al-Rahman Sanchuelo marched on the city to restore order but many of his followers deserted him, due to fatigue from the expedition, as a result, he was defeated and executed by Muhammad's followers.

Supported by the Córdoban population, Muhammad then turned on the Berbers and pillaged their homes. The Berbers were oppressed and an easy target for attack as they weren't allowed to be armed in the city.

In order to support their cause after expulsion from Córdoba, the Berbers chose an Umayyad prince Sulayman ibn al-Hakam as their candidate for the caliphate throne. Sulayman renewed the rebellion with the backing of the Berbers and Castilians under the leadership of count Sancho García of Castile, who had previously received offers of alliance from both Sulayman and Muhammad, finally deciding in favour of Sulayman's professional Berber regiments in exchange for some border fortresses and booty once taking control of Córdoba.

Sancho and Sulayman had defeated Wadih al-Siqlabi (the general of Muhammad II of Córdoba) and his Central March army at the Battle of Alcalá de Henares. The allied Berber-Castilian forces advanced on the city of Córdoba and managed to defeat the Córdobans with both Wadih and Muhammad II at the Battle of Qantish. This allowed Sulayman to enter Córdoba and proclaim himself caliph with the title "al-Musta'in" on 9 November 1009. Muhammad retreated to Toledo where he was supported by two Frankish-Catalan counts. He later confronted Sulayman at the Battle of Aqbat al-Bakr where Sulayman was defeated and chose to retreat to southern Andalucia. Muhammad reclaimed the city of Córdoba and pursued the fleeing Berbers. The two forces met at the Battle of Guadiaro where Sulayman was victorious and Muhammad was forced to retreat back to the city of Córdoba.

== Siege ==
After retreating to Córdoba, Muhammad forced its citizens to fortify the city walls and towers fixing what had been previously destroyed. As an additional obstacle to attack, trenches were dug along the city walls. Muhammad's use of the citizens for such work led to a revolt. Ultimately, his Hajib Wadih killed him on 23 June 1010 and restored Hisham II to the throne.

The Berbers however did not recognize Hisham II and refused to accept him as the caliph. Four months after the Battle of Guadiaro, the Berbers began a siege of Córdoba that would last two and a half years from November 1010 till May 1013. During that time, the Berbers engaged in raids on the countryside and maintained a blockade of Córdoba from their base at the Madinat al-Zahra. During the siege, North African Berber mercenaries stationed in Córdoba rebelled, sacked Medina Azahara, destroyed columns, arches and vaulted architecture, demolished elaborate water channels, bathhouses and aqueducts, plundered the ruins, and set them on fire.

In November 1011, Wadih tried to make peace with the Berbers, but he was executed by his allies while trying to flee. Due to the lack of food, the citizens of Córdoba were forced to eat their animals and even resorted to eating the remains of humans. At night, they risked their lives by venturing out of the city in attempts to find and gather food. The city was ravaged by plagues and Guadalquivir's river floods which caused human losses. The Córdobans wrote two letters to Sulayman and sent them with a delegation, the first of which was to give Sulayman the caliphate and to govern it in the name of Hisham II, however, Sulayman was angered and didn't finish reading the letter because it started with "From Hisham al-Mu'ayyad bi Allah, Amir al-Mu'minin (Prince of Believers)", and Sulayman considered that title was only for him, as he didn't pledge the oath of allegiance to Hisham when he became Caliph in 976 (when he was 10 years old). The second letter was about the abdication of Hisham and swearing allegiance to Sulayman, both letters were ripped up with the delegation returning to Córdoba.

On 11 May 1013, the garrison of Córdoba tried a final sortie that failed and resulted in the city's surrender. The Berbers pillaged the city, sacking and destroying houses and buildings, massacring many citizens including officials and scholars. Many inhabitants fled the city to escape, with the wealthiest ones being reduced to poverty. Hisham II was murdered, and Sulayman restored to the throne. Ultimately, the city was set on fire, with chaos lasting for two months. Notable Jewish and Muslim scholars who escaped were Samuel ibn Naghrillah and Ibn Hazm.

== Aftermath ==
Supporters of Sulayman were granted cities and lands as rewards. The Zirids with Zawi ibn Ziri took Elvira and reigned in Granada, Banu Ifran in Ronda, Banu Khazrun in Arcos de la Frontera, Banu Birzal in Carmona and Jaén, Banu Dammar in Morón de la Frontera, Hammudids in Málaga, Algeciras, Ceuta and Tangier leading to the foundation of Taifa age.

== See also ==
- Fitna of al-Andalus
- List of massacres in Spain
- Timeline of Jewish History
- Timeline of antisemitism
- Timeline of the Muslim presence in the Iberian peninsula
