= Battle of Alcalá de Henares =

1009 battle in Alcalá de Henares near Madrid, Spain

- Part of Fitna of al-Andalus
- The Iberian Peninsula in 1000 AD
| Date | August 1009 |
| Location | Alcalá de Henares |
| Result | Berber-Castilian victory |

Belligerents
| Berbers; County of Castile | Caliphate of Córdoba |

Commanders and leaders
| Sulayman ibn al-Hakam; Sancho García of Castile; Zawi ibn Ziri | Wadih al-Siqlabi |

Casualties and losses
| Unknown | Unknown |

The Battle of Alcalá de Henares (August 1009), was a battle of the Fitna of al-Andalus that took place in Alcalá de Henares near Madrid, between the Middle March forces of the Caliphate of Córdoba under general Wadih al-Siqlabi against the allied Berber-Castilian forces supporting Sulayman ibn al-Hakam's rebellion against Caliph Muhammad II of Córdoba. The battle ended with a victory for the Berbers and the Castilians, forcing Wadih to retreat to Córdoba and join forces with Muhammad II of Córdoba.

== Background ==
In early 1009, Muhammad II rose to power, led a rebellion against Hisham II, Caliph of Córdoba, and deposed him from the throne. Muhammad II took the throne as Caliph but oppressed and then slaughtered the Berbers in Córdoba, ultimately expelling them from the city.

After leaving Córdoba, the Berber forces traveled northeast, took control and gathered at the fortress of Calatrava. At that place, the Berbers selected Sulayman ibn al-Hakam, an ambitious Umayyad prince, as their rival candidate to replace Muhammad II. The Berbers promised him the caliphate and vowed to give him the title of "Al-Musta'in bi-Allah" (he who implores the assistance of God). Expanding their territory toward the Medinaceli region, however, they were confronted and turned back by Wadih, governor of the Middle March of Córdoba. Desperate for resources, the Berbers resorted to starvation rations for over two weeks until they could take no more. Seeking help, the Berbers sent ambassadors to Castile to meet with Sancho García. Promised border fortresses and gifts, Sancho Garcia allied with the Berbers, supplying them with material resources including sheep, coal, honey, firewood, horse saddles and clothing.

== Battle ==
After Sancho García joined forces with Sulayman and the Berbers, they marched to the Medinaceli region where they unsuccessfully tried to convince Wadih to join them and accept Sulayman as the legitimate caliph. At the same time Muhammad II sent reinforcements to Wadih who remained loyal as a Córdoban governor. With the reinforcements, Wadih attacked Sancho García and the Berbers at Alcalá de Henares. In the battle, Wadih was decisively defeated. He ultimately managed to flee and join Muhammad II in the capital city of Córdoba. The Berbers captured many of those who were with Wadih, killing or pardoning individuals at their discretion. The heads of the slain were put on display in the city of Alcalá de Henares.

== Aftermath ==
Sulayman and the rebel army continued their advance on Córdoba. Along the way, they were again confronted by Muhammad II and Wadih on 5 November at the Battle of Qantish where they were victorious. As a result of the battle, Sulayman rose to the throne and was installed as caliph on 8 November 1009 by Zawi ibn Ziri a prominent Berber commander and supporter. Muhammad II and Wadih withdrew to Toledo.
