= Fitna of al-Andalus =

1009-1031 civil war in al-Andalus

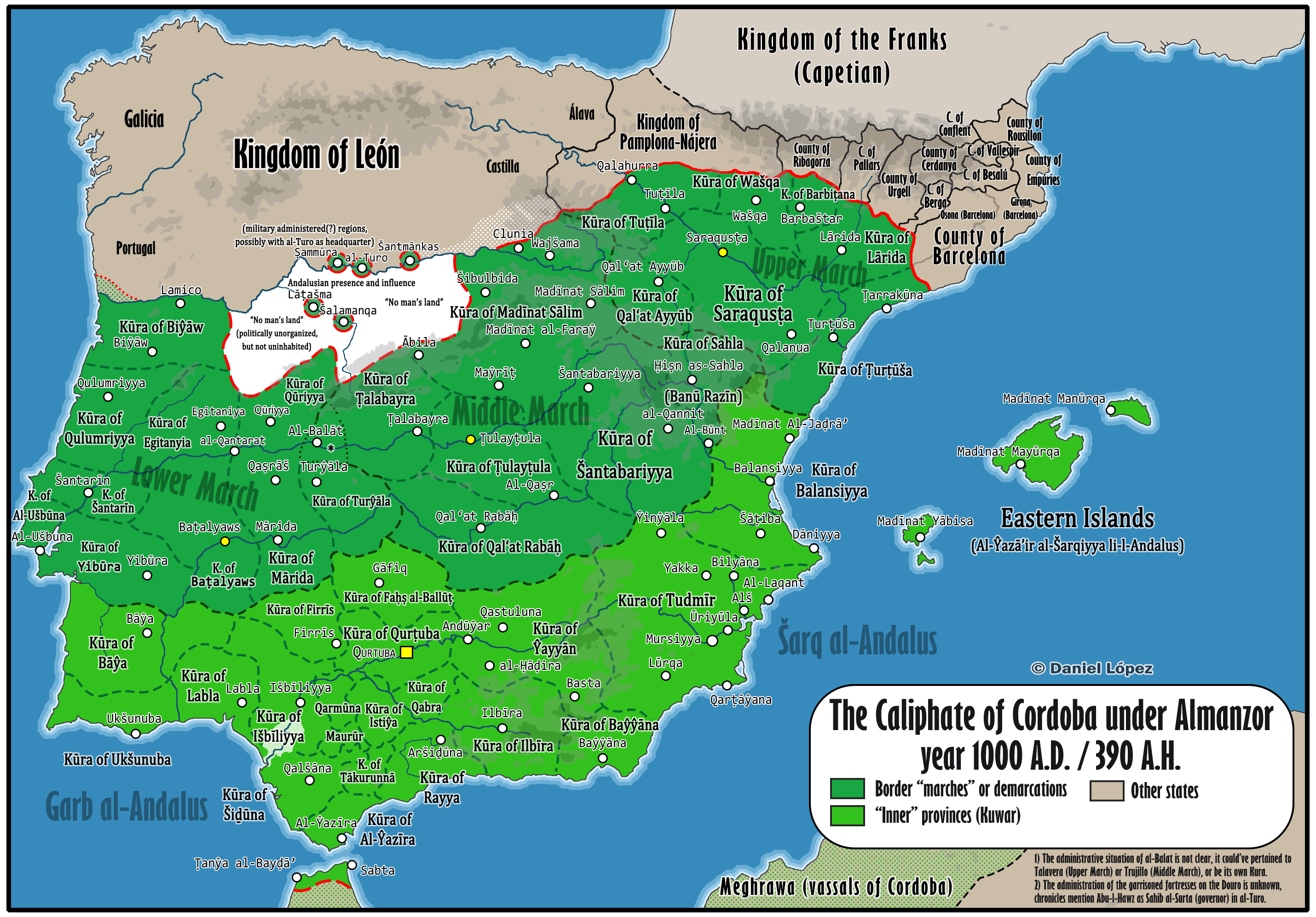
- The Caliphate c. 1000 CE, before the outbreak of the Fitna
Date	1009-1031
Location	Al-Andalus
Result	Sulayman ibn al-Hakam becomes Caliph after the capture of Córdoba.; Hammudids successfully repelled from Córdoba on 11 May 1026.; Hisham III invited to rule Córdoba in June 1026.
Territorial changes	Fall of the Caliphate of Córdoba; Establishment of several independent Taifa kingdoms; Castile gains some border fortresses in the Central March

Belligerents
Hisham's forces; Amirid Saqaliba	Muhammad's forces; Arab tribes; Córdoban citizens; Saqaliba; Supported by: County of Barcelona (in 1010); County of Urgell (in 1010); County of Empúries (in 1010)	Sulayman's forces; Berbers; Hammudids; Supported by: County of Castile (in 1009); Rebellion of Hisham

Commanders and leaders
Hisham II (executed); Abd al-Rahman Sanchuelo (executed)	Muhammad II X Abd al-Jabbar ibn al-Mughira; Wadih al-Siqlabi (executed); Ramon Borrell; Hugh I Ermengol I †	Sulayman ibn al-Hakam; Zawi ibn Ziri; Ali ibn Hammud; Al-Qasim ibn Hammud; Sancho García, Count of Castile (in 1009); Hisham ibn Sulayman (executed); Sulayman ibn Hisham (executed); Abu Bakr ibn Hisham (executed)

Hammudid-Umayyad Conflict (Second Phase of the Fitna)
Date	1016-1026
Location	Al-Andalus

Belligerents
Umayyad Dynasty; Amirid Saqaliba; Banu Tujib	Hammudid Dynasty; Berbers; Taifa of Granada; Amirid Saqaliba (only against Sulayman)	Hammudid Civil Conflict: Hammudids (under Yahya); Hammudids (under Al-Qasim); Berbers

Commanders and leaders
Sulayman ibn al-Hakam (executed); Abd al-Rahman al-Murtada †; Abd al-Rahman V (executed); Muhammad III; Khayran al-Saqlabi; Zuhayr al-Amiri; Al-Mundhir ibn Yahya al-Tujibi	Ali ibn Hammud al-Nasir X Al-Qasim ibn Hammud; Yahya ibn Ali al-Mu'tali; Zawi ibn Ziri; Khayran al-Saqlabi; Zuhayr al-Amiri	Yahya ibn Ali al-Mu'tali Al-Qasim ibn Hammud (POW)

The Fitna of al-Andalus (Arabic: فتنة الأندلس, romanized: Fitnat al-Andalus) (1009–1031), sometimes referred to as the second fitna of al-Andalus, (Note: After the so-called first fitna of al-Andalus, a period of instability and loss of State capacity of the Emirate of Córdoba across, at some point, most of its nominal territory, lasting from the 880s to the proclamation of the Caliphate of Córdoba in 929.) was a civil war in the Caliphate of Córdoba. It began in the year 1009 with a coup d'état which led to the assassination of Abd al-Rahman Sanchuelo, the son of Almanzor, the deposition of the Caliph Hisham II al-Hakam, and the rise to power of Muhammad II of Córdoba, great-grandson of Abd al-Rahman III. The conflict would eventually divide all of Al-Andalus into a series of Taifa Kingdoms. The Fitna finally ended with the definitive abolition of the Caliphate of Córdoba in 1031, although various successor kingdoms would continue to claim the Caliphate for themselves. The added pressures of financial collapse were present due to the large tax burden placed on the populace to finance the continuous war.

Throughout the conflict, various Muslim kingdoms were aided by the Christian kingdoms to the north, this was also used by Christian kingdoms to annex Muslim kingdom areas on the northern border, both in an official capacity and by mercenary Christian soldiers. Córdoba and its suburbs were repeatedly looted during the war, destroying many iconic monuments such as the Alcázar of the Caliphs (Córdoba) and the Medina Azahara. The capital was temporarily moved to Málaga. In a little less than twenty years, 10 different caliphates emerged as successor states to the Caliphate of Córdoba (amongst them was a restored kingdom under Hisham II). Three of these successor kingdoms formed a dynastic succession line known as the Hammudid dynasty.

== Background ==
The death of Caliph al-Hakam II al-Mustanṣir bi-llāh signaled the end of the last effective and powerful Umayyad ruler of Al-Andalus. When illness struck him at the end of his life, Al-Hakam had been careful to secure the oath of allegiance (Bay’ah) for his only son, Hisham, during his lifetime to ensure his succession, even though Hisham was a child at that time and unable to fulfill his duties, and despite the presence of a number of Umayyad princes who could have assumed the caliphate at that time.

When al-Hakam II died, the child Caliph Hisham was still incapacitated, so his mother, Subh of Córdoba, assumed regency. However, real power lay with the chamberlain Ja'far al-Mushafi and the chief of police at the time, Muhammad ibn Abi 'Amir, also known as Almanzor. Less than two years later, Almanzor succeeded in removing al-Mushafi and then Subh, the Caliph's mother, from power. He became the new chamberlain, ruling alone while the legitimate Caliph, Hisham II al-Muʾayyad bi-llāh, remained in office, possessing only the title. Almanzor spread the word that the Caliph had delegated the administration of the country to him so he could devote himself to worship. He then surrounded the Caliph's palace with a wall and a moat, stationed guards, and prevented the Caliph from appearing in public. This marked the beginning of the Amirid dynasty, a state within the state, which extended the Muslim borders of Andalusia in the north to beyond the Douro River. This state continued to flourish until the death of al-Muzaffar, the son of Almanzor and his successor, in October 1008. He was succeeded by his brother, Abd al-Rahman Sanchuelo.

The Amirids followed a policy of favoring Saqaliba and Berbers while excluding Arabs from state positions and military leadership. This encouraged some Berber tribes to migrate from Morocco to Andalusia, and led to the emergence of a class of young Slavs who rose to important positions during the Amirid era.

== The Fitna ==
=== Beginning of the Fitna ===
After the death of al-Muzaffar, Sanchuelo assumed the position of chamberlain on 21 October 1008, and continued to place Hisham II under house arrest. He quickly forced the Caliph, in 16 November 1008, to appoint him as his heir, even though the Caliph had no son at the time. This angered the Umayyads, who saw it as a usurpation of their rightful claim to the Caliphate. This coincided with the efforts of al-Zalfa', al-Muzaffar's mother, to avenge Sanchuelo, whom she believed was responsible for her son's sudden death. An Umayyad prince named Muhammad ibn Hisham, whose father had been killed by the Amirids, took advantage of Sanchuelo's military campaign to repel Sancho García, Count of Castile, who had raided Muslim border regions. On the 16 January 1009, Muhammad ibn Hisham, along with a group of commoners financed by al-Zalfa, attacked the Palace of Cordoba, killing the city's governor. He then deposed Caliph Hisham II al-Muʾayyad bi-llāh and declared himself Caliph Muhammad II al-Mahdī bi'llāh the following day, choosing Sulayman ibn Hisham ibn Sulayman ibn Abd al-Rahman al-Nasir as his heir apparent. In 17 February 1009, al-Mahdi dispatched his cousin Abd al-Jabbar ibn al-Mughira with a large group of commoners to attack al-Zahira. They stormed and looted the palace of al-Muzaffar. Meanwhile, news of the coup against his rule reached Abd al-Rahman Sanchuelo, so he went to Qal'at Rabah and sent messages to the people of Toledo, calling on them to support the deposed Caliph, but they did not respond to his appeal. Then his soldiers abandoned him, and Muhammad II's soldiers captured him and killed him on the 3rd of march, 1009.

Muhammad II imprisoned Hisham II first in the palace, then transferred him to several houses in Cordoba. In April 1009, al-Mahdi Billah exploited the death of a Christian or Jewish man who bore a striking resemblance to Hisham II al-Mu'ayyad Billah, announcing the death of the former caliph and summoning a number of ministers and jurists who testified to Hisham's demise. After consolidating his power, al-Mahdi Billah mistreated the Berbers, who formed the backbone of the Amirid army, and allowed the common people to harass them. He also exiled a number of young Saqaliba from the Amirid army. Subsequently, al-Mahdi Billah turned against the Arab leaders and brutally suppressed several of them. This prompted his uncle, Hisham ibn Sulayman, to ally with the Berbers and the Amirids to depose al-Mahdi. However, they lost their battle against al-Mahdi, and Hisham ibn Sulayman, his son Sulayman, and his brother Abu Bakr were captured and executed. Hisham then permitted the looting of Berber homes, forcing them to flee Cordoba to Qal'at Rabah. Among those who fled with them was an Umayyad prince named Sulayman ibn al-Hakam ibn Abd al-Rahman al-Nasir. The Berbers gathered around him and pledged allegiance to him as Caliph, and he took the title “al-Mustaʿin bi'llāh”.

=== War between the Caliphs ===
Sancho García, Count of Castile, was observing the events in Cordoba. He saw an opportunity to intervene on the side of the Berbers and their leader, Sulayman al-Musta'in Billah, who had marched on Cordoba and defeated al-Mahdi's army at the Battle of Qantish. al-Mahdi fled to Toledo after his defeat, and Sulayman entered the palace on 8 September 1009. The marches were still loyal to al-Mahdi, so Sulayman marched his army to Toledo, calling on its people to submit to him, but they refused. He then marched to Medinaceli, calling on them as well, but they refused again. He then returned to Cordoba as winter approached. Meanwhile, Wadhih al-Amiri, al-Mahdi's governor of Medinaceli, had gone to Tortosa and corresponded with Ramon Borrell, Count of Barcelona, and his brother, Ermengol I, Count of Urgell. He reached an agreement with them to support him with an army to fight the Berbers in exchange for money and the surrender of Madinaceli. This army succeeded in defeating the Berbers at Aqabat al-Bakr, and so al-Mahdi returned to his throne in 3 April 1009.

However, the Berbers regrouped and clashed with al-Mahdi's forces and his allies, inflicting a defeat upon them at the Battle of Guadiaro in June 1010. Al-Mahdi was forced to retreat to Cordoba, whereupon his allies abandoned him. In 23 July 1010, the Amirid boys, mawali of Banu Amir, revolted against him, stormed his palace, and killed him. They then freed Hisham II from his imprisonment and installed him as caliph for the second time. Hisham al-Mu'ayyad attempted to quell the unrest and reunite all the factions by sending al-Mahdi's head to the Berbers and their leader, Sulayman al-Musta'in, to call upon them to submit to his authority. However, they refused and remained steadfast in their allegiance to Sulayman al-Musta'in. They sought the aid of their old ally, Sancho García, Count of Castile, who this time refused to assist them. Then the Berbers resorted to fighting alone, so they attacked and destroyed the city of Al-Zahra in August-September 1010, and their occupation of the city continued until the end of Sha’ban, and they used it as a base to attack the suburbs of Cordoba and the outskirts of Granada and Malaga.

Sancho García, Count of Castile, seized the opportunity and sent messengers to demand that Hisham al-Mu'ayyad return the border fortresses that his father, al-Hakam II, and Almanzor had conquered, such as Saint Esteban, El Borgo de Osma, Gharmaj, Clunia, and others. Fearing an alliance between the Count of Castile and his Berber adversaries, al-Mu'ayyad decided to cede these fortresses, numbering around two hundred, to the Count of Castile. Meanwhile, the Berbers intensified their siege on Cordoba. All attempts at negotiation and reconciliation between Hisham II and the Berbers failed, and the siege continued until the people of Cordoba decided to engage with the Berbers in 10 May 403, in a great battle that ended in a Berber victory and the sack of Cordoba. The following day, Sulayman al-Musta'in was reinstated as Caliph. As for Hisham II al-Mu'ayyad, some say that al-Musta'in imprisoned him for a time, and then his son, Muhammad ibn Sulayman, killed him. Others say that he fled to Almería and lived in hiding until his death. Sulayman II began his caliphate, and the state's authority was confined to Cordoba and its surroundings. The first thing he did was reward his Berber allies by appointing them to the positions of chamberlain and minister. He saw fit to keep them away from Cordoba, so he granted the Sanhaja and their leaders, Banu Ziri, the governorate of Elvira, and granted the Maghrawa the interior regions of Andalus, and the Banu Barzal and Banu Ifran the district of Jaén, and the Banu Dummar and Azdaja Sidonia and Morón, and he confirmed Al-Mundhir ibn Yahya Al-Tujibi as governor of Zaragoza and the Upper March, and appointed Ali ibn Hammud over Ceuta, and his brother Al-Qasim over Algeciras, Tangier and Asilah.

=== Banu Hammud join the conflict ===
Two years after Sulayman's second reign, Ali ibn Hammud, Sulayman's governor of Ceuta, claimed to possess a letter from the legitimate caliph, Hisham II al-Mu'ayyad, appointing him as his heir. He crossed into Algeciras, his brother's province, with Berber forces, and from there marched to Malaga. There, he encountered the forces of the young Khayran al-Saqlabi, a freedman of the Amirids who had fled to Almeria after al-Musta'in assumed his second governorship. They then met with the Sanhaja forces led by Zawi ibn Ziri at Elvira. Al-Musta'in marched his army to fight them, and a battle ensued, ending in the defeat of Sulayman and the death of many of his supporters. He, along with his father al-Hakam and brother Abd al-Rahman, was captured. In 7 July 1016, Ali ibn Hammud entered the Palace of Cordoba, executed Sulayman, his father, and his brother, and proclaimed himself the new caliph.

After Ali consolidated his power, he began to deal firmly with all his opponents, without distinction between Arabs and Berbers. His ally, Khayran al-Saqlabi, fled to eastern Andalusia, where the Amirids were gathering. There, he called for the caliphate of a new Umayyad emir named Abd al-Rahman ibn Muhammad ibn Abd al-Malik, who had fled from Cordoba to Jaén, who became Abd al-Rahman IV al-Murtaḍā bi-llāh. Khayran and the Amirids rallied around him, and they were later joined by al-Mundhir ibn Yahya al-Tujibi, the governor of Zaragoza and the Upper March, as well as the governors of Xàtiva, Valencia, and Tortosa. When Ali ibn Hammud learned of their movement, he prepared an army to confront them, but he was assassinated by three of his Saqlabi servants in the caliph's palace in 22 March 1018. His brother, al-Qasim, learned of the assassination and traveled from Seville to Cordoba, sending his brother's body to Ceuta for burial. Al-Murtada's army first marched to Elvira to fight the Sanhaja, allies of Banu Hammud. They fought in 1018 in a battle that lasted for days and ended with the victory of the Sanhaja and the death of Abd al-Rahman IV, so that the matter was settled for Al-Qasim ibn Hammud.

Al-Qasim, however, adopted a different approach to the people of Cordoba than his brother. He treated them leniently, reduced some taxes, and attempted to break the Berber hold on power by surrounding himself with Black people, appointing them as his ministers. He also tried to win over Khayran al-Saqlabi, who had returned to Almeria, but was unsuccessful. He did, however, succeed in neutralizing the Amirids by appointing Zuhayr al-Saqlabi as governor of Jaén and Qal'at Rabah. Meanwhile, Yahya ibn Ali ibn Hammud considered himself the rightful successor to his father. He crossed from his governorship in Ceuta to his brother Idris's governorship in Málaga and assembled an army, which he marched on Cordoba. Al-Qasim fled Cordoba to Seville in 6 August 1021, before Yahya's army arrived. Yahya entered Cordoba in 13 August 1021, where he was proclaimed the new caliph.

Less than a year and a half later, the Berbers deposed Yahya ibn Ali and called for al-Qasim's return to the caliphate. He was pledged allegiance in again in 12 February 1023. During his second caliphate, al-Qasim sought to appease the Berbers, granting them free rein. This led to the Berbers' harsh treatment of the people of Cordoba, until the population revolted against them and prepared to fight. They deposed al-Qasim in 10 September 1023, and fought al-Qasim and the Berbers fiercely until they defeated them. Al-Qasim fled once more to Seville, which refused to receive him and expelled him and his two sons to Jerez. Yahya ibn Ali then besieged his uncle al-Qasim in Jerez until the city surrendered, and his uncle was taken prisoner, remaining in captivity until his death in 1036. After the deposition of al-Qasim ibn Hammud, the people of Cordoba decided to restore the caliphate to the Umayyads. They chose Abd al-Rahman V al-Mustazhir Billah, whose reign was short-lived. He abused his power, and the people of Cordoba deposed and killed him. He was succeeded by Muhammad III al-Mustakfi Billah, who ruled for a year and a half, a period marked by corruption and debauchery. He was deposed in 26 May 1025. Cordoba remained in chaos for months until Yahya ibn Ali marched on it with his forces and entered the city on the 9 November 1025. He remained there until February 1026, then departed for Malaga, leaving its administration to two of his ministers and a garrison of a thousand Berbers. Within two months, Khayran and Zuhayr al-Amiri marched on Cordoba and incited its inhabitants to attack the Berbers, which they did in 11 May 1026.

=== End of the Fitna ===
After the people of Cordoba deposed Yahya ibn Ali ibn Hammud from his second caliphate, they decided once again to restore the caliphate to the Umayyads. They chose Hisham ibn Muhammad ibn Abd al-Malik and pledged allegiance to him in 15 June 1026, bestowing upon him the title al-Mu'tad Billah. Al-Mu'tad Billah remained in Alpont for the first two years of his caliphate, then moved to Cordoba in January-February 1027. During his reign, real power lay with one of his ministers, al-Hakam ibn Sa'id al-Qazzaz, who mistreated the people of Cordoba and monopolized all authority. An Umayyad emir named Umayya ibn Abd al-Rahman ibn Hisham ibn Sulayman ibn Abd al-Rahman al-Nasir, known as al-'Iraqi, exploited the anger of the Cordobans and assassinated al-Hakam al-Qazzaz in October-November 1031. He then attacked the palace with the general populace, forcing al-Mu'tad Billah to flee with his family, pleading with his attackers to spare his life. Then the people of Cordoba saw the complete abolition of the caliphate, so they deposed Hisham III in 30 November 1031, and banished all the Umayyads from the city.

== Aftermath ==
Thus, a new period in the history of Andalus began, which is known as the rule of the Taifa kings.

== Lineages of the families involving the Fitna ==
Royal families involved in the Fitna of al-Andalus (1009–1031)

Umayyads	Hashimid Hammudids
Abd Shams ibn Abd Manaf	Hashim ibn Abd Manaf
Umayya	Abd al-Muttalib
Abu Talib
Ali
so many generations	Hasan
Hasan
Abd al-Rahman III	Idris I
Abd al-Jabbar	Al-Hakam II	Sulayman	Abd al-Malik	Ubayd Allah	so many generations
Hisham	Hisham II	al-Hakam	Hisham	Abu Bakr	Muhammed	Abd al-Rahman	Hammud
Muhammad II	Abd al-Rahman V	Sulayman I	Sulayman	Abd al-Rahman	Abd al-Rahman IV	Hisham III	Muhammad III	Ali al-Nasir	Al-Qasim al-Ma'mun
Muhammed	Abd al-Rahman	Umayyah	Yahya al-Mu'tali	Idris

== See also ==
- Almoravid dynasty
- Al-Andalus

== Bibliography ==
- André Clot, L'Espagne Musulmane, Ed.Perrin, 1999, ISBN 2-262-02301-8
