= Siege of Granada (1018) =

- Part of Fitna of al-Andalus
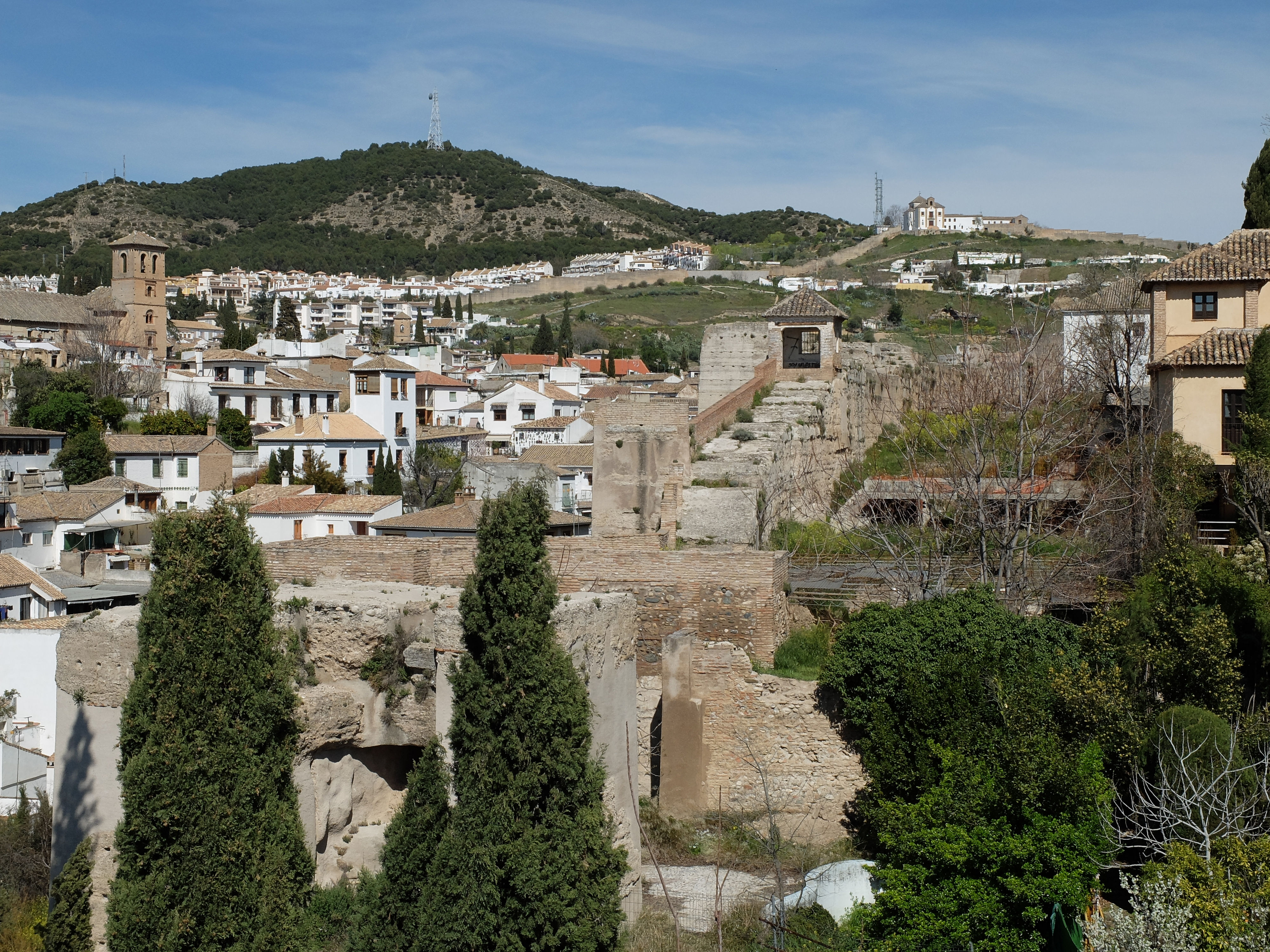
- View of the Zirid walls of Granada
Date	1018
Location	Granada
Result	Zirid Victory

Belligerents
Zirids of Granada	Caliphate of Cordoba; (Pretender): Taifa of Almería; Taifa of Murcia; Taifa of Tortosa; Taifa of Zaragoza

Commanders and leaders
Zawi ibn Ziri	Abd al-Rahman IV X Khayran of Almeria and Murcia; Labib al-Fata al-Saqlabi of Tortosa; Al-Mundhir ibn Yahya al-Tujibi of Zaragoza

Units involved
900 men	4,000 men

Casualties and losses
Unknown	Unknown

The siege of Granada in 1018 was an attempt by the Umayyad pretender Abd al-Rahman IV and his followers to conquer Granada from Zawi ibn Ziri.

== Context ==
Abd al-Rahman IV had been proclaimed caliph on April 29, 1018. In order to deter an attack on Córdoba, a siege on Granada, where Zawi ibn Ziri had taken control was decided.

== Battle ==
Abd al-Rahman IV and the commanders Khayran and Al-Mundhir ibn Yahya al-Tujibi were at the head of 4,000 men. Zawi ibn Ziri had a contingent of 900 men, despite being greatly outnumbered he was able to defeat the army of Abd al-Rahman IV with a counterattack that scattered the enemy forces and caused all of the commanders to flee.

== Consequences ==
The counter-attack from Granada sent all three leaders in different directions. The Umayyad pretender Abd al-Rahman IV was later caught at the river Guadix and assassinated.
