= Wadih al-Siqlabi =

Umayyad Caliphate of Córdoba general (died 1011)

Wāḍiḥ al-Ṣiqlabī (Arabic: واضح الصقلبي; died November 1011) was a Saqaliba general of the late Umayyad Caliphate of Córdoba. He served as governor of the Middle March and as the ḥājib, effectively prime minister, of the caliphs Muḥammad II (1010) and Hishām II (1010–1011). He played a major role in the opening of the final fitna (civil war) of Córdoba.

Wāḍiḥ, a Slav, was the governor of the Middle March with his capital at Medinaceli from at least the 990s. In 997, the leader of the Maghrāwa Berber tribe in Africa, Zīrī ibn ʿAṭīya, renounced his allegiance to Córdoba. In response, al-Manṣūr, the de facto ruler of the Caliphate, dispatched Wāḍiḥ to Africa at the head of a large army in 998 to expand the Umayyad beachhead there, which at the time consisted only of Ceuta. He later sent his son, ʿAbd al-Malik, to assist Wāḍiḥ. Together they defeated Zīrī, captured Fez and established an Umayyad administration over all of Morocco, which lasted until the death of al-Manṣūr in 1002.

After the forced abdication of Caliph Hishām II in February 1009, Wāḍiḥ supported the new caliph, Muḥammad II al-Mahdī. When Muḥammad alienated the Berbers in the army, many withdrew from the city of Córdoba north towards Calatrava, proclaiming as their caliph Sulaymān ibn al-Ḥakam. They approached Wāḍiḥ to lead them, but were rebuffed. Count Sancho García of Castile, however, accepted their offer and the combined Castilian–Berber army marched on Córdoba. After interfering with but failing to stop their advance, Wāḍiḥ retreated to Córdoba. In November 1009, the city fell. Muḥammad and Wāḍiḥ escaped to Toledo, while the Berbers installed Sulaymān as caliph.

Having failed to prevent the enthronement of Sulaymān, Wāḍiḥ sought to extricate himself from politics. He went to Tortosa and from there sent a letter to Sulaymān, begging to be relieved of his post so he could go to Lorca and devote himself to God, probably in a ribāṭ. He was refused, and began working for Muḥammad's restoration. He secured the allegiance of some of the Ṣaqāliba in the east. He negotiated an alliance with the Frankish counts Ramon Borrell of Barcelona and Ermengol I of Urgell. Each count received 200 dīnārs and together they supplied 9,000 soldiers, to be paid two dīnārs a day. The Frankish army joined with Wāḍiḥ's at Toledo and together they marched towards Córdoba. The Berber army of Sulaymān marched out to meet them. At ʿAqabat al-Baqar in May 1010, Wāḍiḥ and the Franks won a major victory and advanced to the capital. Wāḍiḥ was appointed ḥājib. On 21 June, however, the combined army was defeated at the battle of Guadiaro, after which the remaining Frankish contingent left for home.

Returning to Córdoba after his defeat, Wāḍiḥ staged a coup d'état with the support of other officers who had once served al-Manṣūr. He had Muḥammad, now extremely unpopular in the capital, arrested, tried and executed on 23 June 1010. He sent his head to the Berbers and had his body thrown into a sewer. Hishām II was reinstated, and immediately re-appointed Wāḍiḥ ḥājib. Unimpressed by the head of Muḥammad, Sulaymān and the Berbers laid siege to the city. Wāḍiḥ tried sending messengers to make terms with the besiegers, but they were intercepted. He was captured by his own allies while trying to flee Córdoba in November 1011 and killed.

== Bibliography ==
- Collins, Roger (2012). Caliphs and Kings: Spain, 796–1031. Wiley-Blackwell.
- Guichard, Pierre (2006). From the Arab Conquest to the Reconquest: The Splendour and Fragility of Al-Andalus. Junta de Andalucía, Consejería de Cultura.
- Kennedy, Hugh (1996). Muslim Spain and Portugal: A Political History of al-Andalus. Routledge.
- Makki, Mahmoud (1994). "The Political History of al-Andalus (92/711–897/1492)". In Salma Khadra Jayyusi (ed.). The Legacy of Muslim Spain. Brill. pp. 3–87.
- Scales, Peter C. (1994). The Fall of the Caliphate of Córdoba: Berbers and Andalusis in Conflict. E. J. Brill.
- Wasserstein, David J. (2000). "The Emergence of the Taifa Kingdom of Toledo". Al-Qantara. 21 (1): 17–56.
