= Battle of Aqbat al-Bakr =

1010 battle in Spain

Coordinates: 38.1833°N 5.0167°W

- Part of the Fitna of al-Andalus
- The Iberian Peninsula in 1000 AD
Date	22 May 1010
Location	Espiel, Caliphate of Córdoba
Result	Rebel-Catalan victory

Belligerents
Andalusian Rebels: Saqaliba (supporting Muhammad ibn Hisham); Catalan counties: County of Barcelona; County of Empúries; County of Urgell	Caliphate of Córdoba: Berbers (supporting Sulayman ibn al-Hakam)

Commanders and leaders
Muhammad ibn Hisham; Wadih al-Siqlabi; Ramon Borrell; Hugh I Ermengol I †	Sulayman ibn al-Hakam

Strength
30,000 Saqaliba Rebels; 9,000 Catalans	Unknown

The Battle of Aqbat al-Bakr (22 May 1010) was a battle of the Fitna of al-Andalus that took place in the area in and around Espiel, Spain. The battle took place between the Berber forces of the Caliphate of Cordoba, commanded by Sulayman ibn al-Hakam, against a Catalan-Andalusian alliance of 30,000 Andalusian Saqaliba rebels with 9,000 Catalan, trying to overthrow their Caliph overlords under the command of Muhammad ibn Hisham; Wadih al-Siqlabi, governor of al-Tagr al-Awsat; and several West Frankish counts and bishops, including Ermengol I of Urgell who was killed during the fight, Hugh I of Empúries, and Ramon Borrell of Barcelona.

The two armies met at Espiel on 22 May 1010 and the forces of the Caliphate of Cordoba were decisively routed, marking one of the first battles of the war and a significant gain for the rebel Catalan-Andalusian alliance. Although this battle took place in the general time frame of the Spanish Reconquista, it was not unusual for Christian and Muslim forces to join together to achieve common goals.
