= Subh of Córdoba =

Queen mother of Córdoba (10th century)

Subh صبح
- Queen mother Umm walad of al-Hakam II
- Born: c. 940; Kingdom of Pamplona
- Died: c. 999; Córdoba, Caliphate of Córdoba
- Burial: Córdoba, Spain
- Spouse: Al-Hakam II
- Issue: Abd al-Rahman (962–970); Hisham II (966–1013)
Names
- Subh Umm Hisham
Regnal name
- Subh, Malikat Qurtuba

Subh (Arabic: صبح, romanized: Ṣubḥ; circa 940 – circa 999), also known as Aurora in the Basque Country, or as Sobeya, Sobha, or Ṣabīḥa Malikat Qurṭuba ('Sabiha, Queen of Córdoba'), was the wife of Caliph al-Hakam II of Córdoba (r. 961–976), and the regent of the Caliphate of Córdoba in al-Andalus during the minority of her son, Caliph Hisham II.

== Life ==
=== Early life ===
Subh was originally from Navarre by the name Aurora, who was brought as a slave – a Jāriya – to be a concubine in the harem of the Caliph in Córdoba. Her origin has alternatively been identified as Basque from the Gascony region.

=== Concubine ===
In the Caliph's harem of Cordoba, Subh became the favorite concubine and then the wife of the Caliph al-Hakam. She was described as not only beautiful, but also as intelligent and analytical. She was knowledgeable in music, poetry, and Arabic literature. When she had a son with al-Hakam, she became an Umm walad and thus automatically freed at the death of her enslaver.

In the later years of his reign, the Caliph lost interest of the routine management of political affairs, and reportedly left it to Subh. To fill this task, she expressed the need for a secretary, and in 966, Al-Mansur Ibn Abi Aamir (also known as Almanzor) was appointed to this post. There were rumors that Almanzor became her lover and that this was the reason why she was to give him such influence in the affairs of state, and their alleged relationship became the subject of satirical poems and libelous rhymes. The Caliph reportedly alluded to the matter once when he remarked that Almanzor apparently was remarkable influence in the minds of the harem, but apparently the Caliph never saw a reason to take any action. Whether they actually were lovers or not have never been confirmed, but it is a fact that Almazor became a trusted collaborator to whom she trusted completely in her political work.

=== Queen mother of Hisham II ===
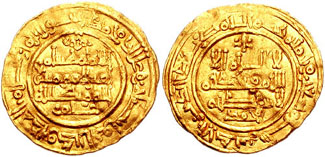
Gold dinar of Hisham II, son of al-Hakam II

In 976, Caliph al-Hakam died and was succeeded by his and Subh's son, the ten-year-old Caliph Hisham II, under the regency of General Ghalib al-Nasiri, al-Mushafi (the chief administrator of the late caliph), and Subh as well as Al-Mansur Ibn Abi Aamir, who became the administrator of the properties left to Subh by al-Hakam. Reportedly, Subh provided Almanzor with the necessary funds to give him control of the army, by which he could secure the stability necessary for her son, a minor, to be secured as Caliph with her as regent, after which she gave him much power in her government. Subh also named Almanzor hajib [chief of viziers]. Almanzor had become the de facto ruler of Córdoba by 978, pushing both Subh and Hisham to the sidelines.

The 13th-century historian Al-Murakushi described the situation: "The stature of Ibn 'Amir continued to grow until he made the acquaintance of Sayyida Subh, the mother of Hisham, the son of al-Hakam. He took charge of her business affairs and managed her lands. In this way he earned her appreciation. Things continued like this until the death of al-Hakam. Hisham was still young, and there was fear of trouble. Ibn 'Amir provided Subh with the security and calm necessary for her son to be able to reign. Ibn 'Amir was very competent and circumstances worked in his favour. Subh made available the necessary funds, and he was able to win over the army. There then followed a train of circumstances that allowed him to rise even higher, until he became practically the sole manager of the affairs of state."

The collaboration between Subh and Almanzor reportedly worked completely well, friendly and close until 986, but as Almanzor's power and the caliph's isolation grew, Subh became extremely concerned, and their alliance and effective rule began to disintegrate in 996, when a conflict arose between them, because Almanzor was so ambitious, he angered Subh and her other allies, putting him in front of her and her allies. This conflict, causing Subh to an unsuccessful attempt to depose Almanzor from his position by introducing other male favorites as his rivals. During two years of bloody rivalry only for their own power, they created divisions in the center of the caliphate. Her second and last attempt to depose him in 998 resulted in his complete accession of all power, and ended her rule.

== In popular culture ==
Subh appeared as a character in the 2003 Syrian television series Córdoba's Spring, played by Nesreen Tafesh. The series was written by Walid Saif.

== See also ==
- Moors
