= Battle of Qantish =

1009 battle in Spain

- Part of Fitna of al-Andalus
- The Iberian Peninsula in 1000 AD
Date	5 November 1009
Location	Qantish
Result	Berber-Castilian victory: Sulayman ibn al-Hakam becomes Caliph of Córdoba; Sack of Córdoba

Belligerents
Berbers; County of Castile	Caliphate of Córdoba

Commanders and leaders
Sulayman ibn al-Hakam; Zawi ibn Ziri; Sancho García of Castile	Muhammad II of Córdoba; Wadih al-Siqlabi

Casualties and losses
Unknown	10,000-30,000 killed

The Battle of Qantish (5 November 1009) was a battle of the Fitna of al-Andalus that took place in the mountainous region of Qantish, east of Córdoba. The battle was fought between the forces of Caliph Muhammad II of Córdoba and his general Wadih al-Siqlabi against those of Prince Sulayman ibn al-Hakam, whose army was primarily composed of Berbers of al-Andalus who had been persecuted by the caliph and the people of Córdoba. Sulayman was allied with Castilian forces led by Sancho García of Castile, Count of Castile.

The battle ended in a decisive victory for Sulayman ibn al-Hakam and his ally Sancho García. Muhammad II fled after suffering a crushing defeat by the Berbers. Estimates of the Córdoban troops killed range from 10,000 to 30,000. On 8 November 1009, Sulayman and the Berbers entered Córdoba in triumph and sacked the city. Sulayman was then installed on the throne by Zawi ibn Ziri and was proclaimed caliph with the honorific title "al-Musta'in" given by Zawi.
