= Al-Hakam II =

Caliph of Córdoba from 961 to 976

Al-Hakam II الحکم الثاني
- Khalifa al-Mustanṣir bi-llah
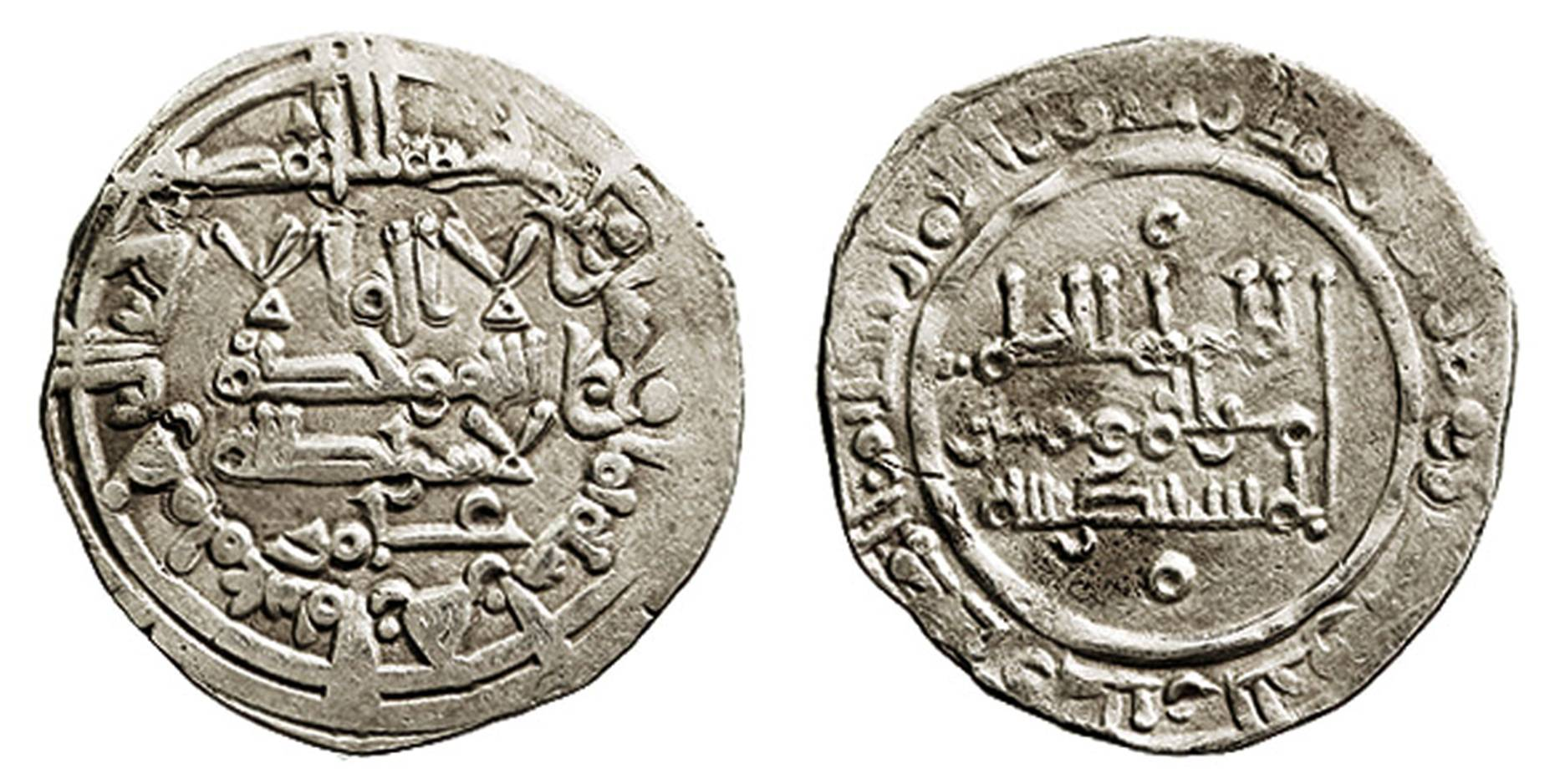
- Silver dirham of Al-Hakam II, 968–69

2nd Caliph of Córdoba
- Reign: 15 October 961 – 1 October 976
- Predecessor: Abd al-Rahman III
- Successor: Hisham II
- Born: 13 January 915; Córdoba
- Died: 16 October 976 (aged 61); Córdoba
- Spouse: Subh
- Issue: Abd al-Rahman (962–970); Hisham II (966–1013)
- Dynasty: Umayyad
- Father: Abd al-Rahman III
- Mother: Murjan
- Religion: Islam

Abū al-ʿĀṣ al-Mustanṣir bi-Llāh al-Hakam ibn ʿAbd al-Raḥmān (أَبُو الْعَاصٍ الْمُسْتَنْصِرِ بِاللهِ الْحَكْمِ بْن عَبْدِ الرَّحْمَنِ; 13 January 915 – 1 October 976), better known as Al-Hakam II, was the second Umayyad caliph of Córdoba in Al-Andalus, ruling from 961 to 976. He was the son of Abd al-Rahman III and Murjan.

== Rule ==
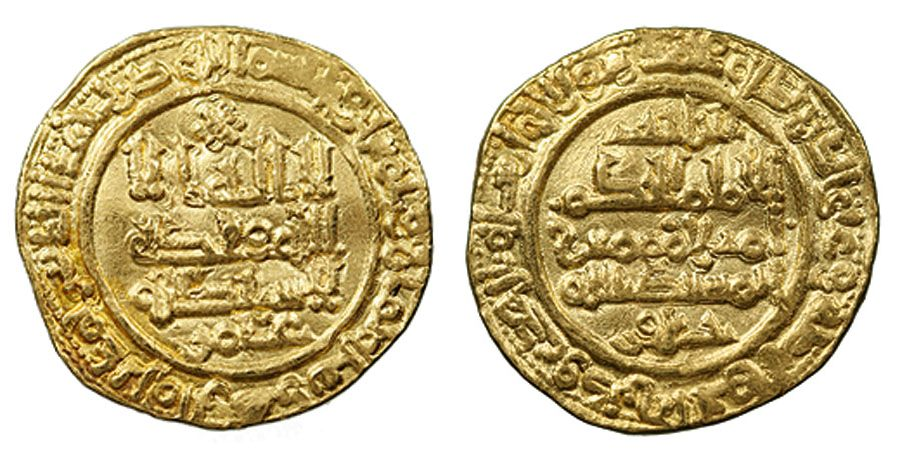
Dinar of al-Hakam II, 969 AD

Al-Hakam II succeeded to the Caliphate after the death of his father Abd al-Rahman III in 961. He secured peace with the Catholic kingdoms of northern Iberia, and made use of the stability to develop agriculture through the construction of irrigation works. Economic development was also encouraged through the widening of streets and the building of markets.

Whilst the internal administration was left increasingly to vizir Al-Mushafi, general Ghalib ibn Abd al-Rahman was gradually gaining influence as leader of the army in North Africa. He was chiefly preoccupied with repulsing the last Norman attacks (c. 970), and with the struggle against the Zirids and the Fatimids in northern Morocco. The Fatimids were defeated in Morocco in 974, while Al-Hakam II was able to maintain the supremacy of the caliphate over the Catholic states of Navarre, Castile and León.

== Patronage ==
=== Literature and science ===
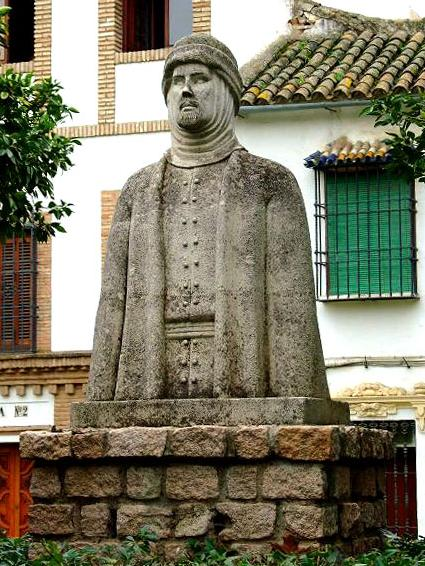
Statue of al-Hakam II, Córdoba

Hakam himself was well versed in numerous sciences. He had books purchased from Damascus, Baghdad, Constantinople, Cairo, Mecca, Medina, Kufa, and Basra. His status as a patron of knowledge brought him fame across the Muslim world to the point that even books written in Persia, which was under Arab Abbasid control, were dedicated to him. During his reign, a massive translation effort was undertaken, and many books were translated from Latin and Greek into Arabic. He formed a joint committee of Muwallad Muslims and Mozarab Catholics for this task.

His personal library was of enormous proportions. Some accounts speak of him having more than 600,000 books. The catalogue of library books itself was claimed to be 44 volumes long. Of special importance to Al-Hakam was history, and he himself wrote a history of al-Andalus. Following his death, Hajib Almanzor had all "ancient science" books destroyed.

The mathematician Lubna of Córdoba was employed as Al-Hakam's private secretary. She was said to be "thoroughly versed in the exact sciences; her talents were equal to the solution of the most complex geometrical and algebraic problems".

The famous physician, scientist, and surgeon Abu al-Qasim al-Zahrawi (Abulcasis) was also active in Al-Hakam's court during his reign, while the leading figures of the Translation movement during the reign of Hakam were Mutazilites and Ibn Masarra.

=== Construction ===
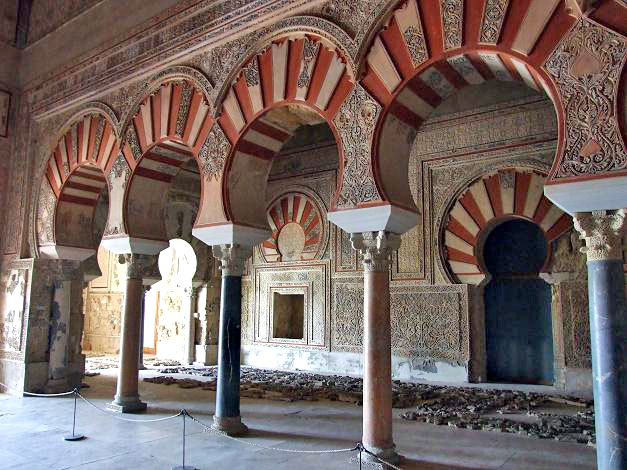
Medina Azahara, completed by Al-Hakam II

Starting in 961, al-Hakam II initiated a major expansion of the Great Mosque of Córdoba. The mosque's prayer hall was extended 45 meters further south. This expansion added several of the building's most architecturally significant features that have survived to the present day, including a richly decorated mihrab, intersecting multifoil arches, and four ornate ribbed domes.

The palace-city of Madinat al-Zahra, first built by his father Abd al-Rahman III after 936, continued to be built up and renovated under al-Hakam II.

== Personal life ==
Al-Hakam married Subh of Cordoba, a Basque concubine. She held sway and strong influence over the court. It is said that al-Hakam nicknamed her with the masculine name Ja'far. They had two sons, the first is Abd al-Rahman (962–970), who died young, and the second is Hisham II (966–1013).

=== Possible homosexuality ===
According to É. Lévi-Provençal, the phrase Ḥubb al-walad, as found in al-Maqqari's Nafḥ al-ṭayyib, is a reference to al-Hakam's homosexuality or "preference for boys". However, several historians render it as "paternal love", referring instead to him choosing his young son as a successor. The fact that he did not produce a suitable heir before the age of 46 has been ascribed either to him being more attracted to men,—although this is only reported euphemistically in the sources,—or because he was too absorbed with his books to care for sensual pleasures. Subh may have dressed as a ghulam or a young man to make herself more attractive to al-Hakam (adopting a short haircut and wearing trousers), although it is also possible she did this in order to gain better access to the male-dominated royal court.

== Death and succession ==
Al-Hakam II suffered a stroke near the end of his life that curtailed his activities and may explain why he was unable to properly prepare his son for leadership. Modern scholars have speculated that, based on the historical descriptions of his death, it was another cerebrovascular stroke, possibly brought on by the cold weather, that claimed his life in October 976. He was succeeded by his son, Hisham II al-Mu'ayad, who was 11 years old at the time and during his minority under regency by General Ghalib al-Nasiri, al-Mushafi, chief administrator of the late caliph, and Subh, his mother, assisted by her secretary Almanzor.

== See also ==
- Moors
- Islam in Spain

Al-Hakam II Umayyad dynasty Cadet branch of the Quraysh
Preceded by Abd al-Rahman III	Caliph of Córdoba; 961–976	Succeeded by Hisham II
