= Central March =

Northern buffer territory of the Emirate/Caliphate of Córdoba (8th–11th centuries)

The Central March (Spanish Marca Media) in the Caliphate of Córdoba (green)

The Central March or Middle March (Arabic: الثغر الأوسط, romanized: al-Thaghr al-Awsaṭ) was the central of the three marches along the northern frontier of the Emirate and (after 929) Caliphate of Córdoba between the 8th and 11th centuries. It lay roughly along the Tagus valley, between the Lower March to the southwest and the Upper March to the northeast. Its administrative centre was at first Toledo, later Medinaceli.

The concept of al-thughūr (الثغر), the frontier zones or marches between the dār al-ḥarb and the dār al-islām, was found throughout the Islamic world. The marches were not fixed, but fluctuated with the fortunes of Islam. The stability of the frontier in Spain between the late 8th and the early 11th centuries is responsible for the outsized role and relatively well-defined nature of the thughūr there. The tripartite division was certainly in existence by the 9th century.

The Central March extended east as far as the edge of the territory known as Bārūsha, which was part of the Upper March and lay south of Daroca, covering Molina. Late in the reign of the Emir Muḥammad I (852–886), there was a chain of fortresses stretching from Bārūsha to Toledo at Madrid, Talamanca, Canales, Olmos and Calataifa.

In the reign of ʿAbd al-Raḥmān III (912–961), the classical tripartite division disappeared. The Central March and the Lower March were combined under the name of the latter but with the character of an enlarged Central March. ʿAbd al-Raḥmān moved the capital north from Toledo to a fortress he constructed at Medinaceli. This expanded march included the Sierra de Guadarrama north of Madrid and a string of fortresses along the Tagus. According to Aḥmad al-Rāzī, its northern extensions towards the Duero comprised the districts of Santaver, Racupel, Zorita, Guadalajara and Medinaceli with their fortresses, including Castejón de Henares, Uclés, Cuenca, Huete and Huelamo. Towards the former Lower March were the fortresses of Talavera, Madrid, Coria, Coimbra.

The thughūr persisted in name through the first taifa (faction) period following the collapse of the caliphate in the 11th century, but by the 12th they were gone. The Reconquista (Christian reconquest) of the northern lands of al-Andalus (Islamic Iberia) had rendered the old system of fortresses and districts impossible.

== See also ==
- Wāḍiḥ al-Ṣiqlabī, governor of the march c. 997–1010

== Bibliography ==
- Cabañero Subiza, Bernabé (2006). "Una comarca prefigurada en época islámica en el ʿamal de Barbităniyya" (PDF). In N. Juste (ed.). Comarca de Somontano de Barbastro. Gobierno de Aragón. pp. 75–86.
- Bosch Vilá, Jacinto (2016) [1962]. "Considerations with Respect to 'al-Thaghr in al-Andalus' and the Political-Administrative Division of Muslim Spain". In Manuela Marín (ed.). The Formation of al-Andalus, Part 1: History and Society. Routledge. pp. 377–387.
- Collins, Roger (2012). Caliphs and Kings: Spain, 796–1031. London: Wiley Blackwell.
- Latham, J. D. (2000). "al-Thughūr, 2: In al-Andalus". In Bearman, P. J.; Bianquis, Th.; Bosworth, C. E.; van Donzel, E. & Heinrichs, W. P. (eds.). The Encyclopaedia of Islam, Second Edition. Volume X: T–U. Leiden: E. J. Brill. pp. 447–449. doi:10.1163/1573-3912_islam_COM_1214. ISBN 978-90-04-11211-7.
