= Sulayman ibn al-Hakam =

Ruler of Córdoba,1009–1010, 1013–1016

Sulayman ibn al-Hakam سلیمان الثاني بن الحكم
- al-Musta'in bi-llah
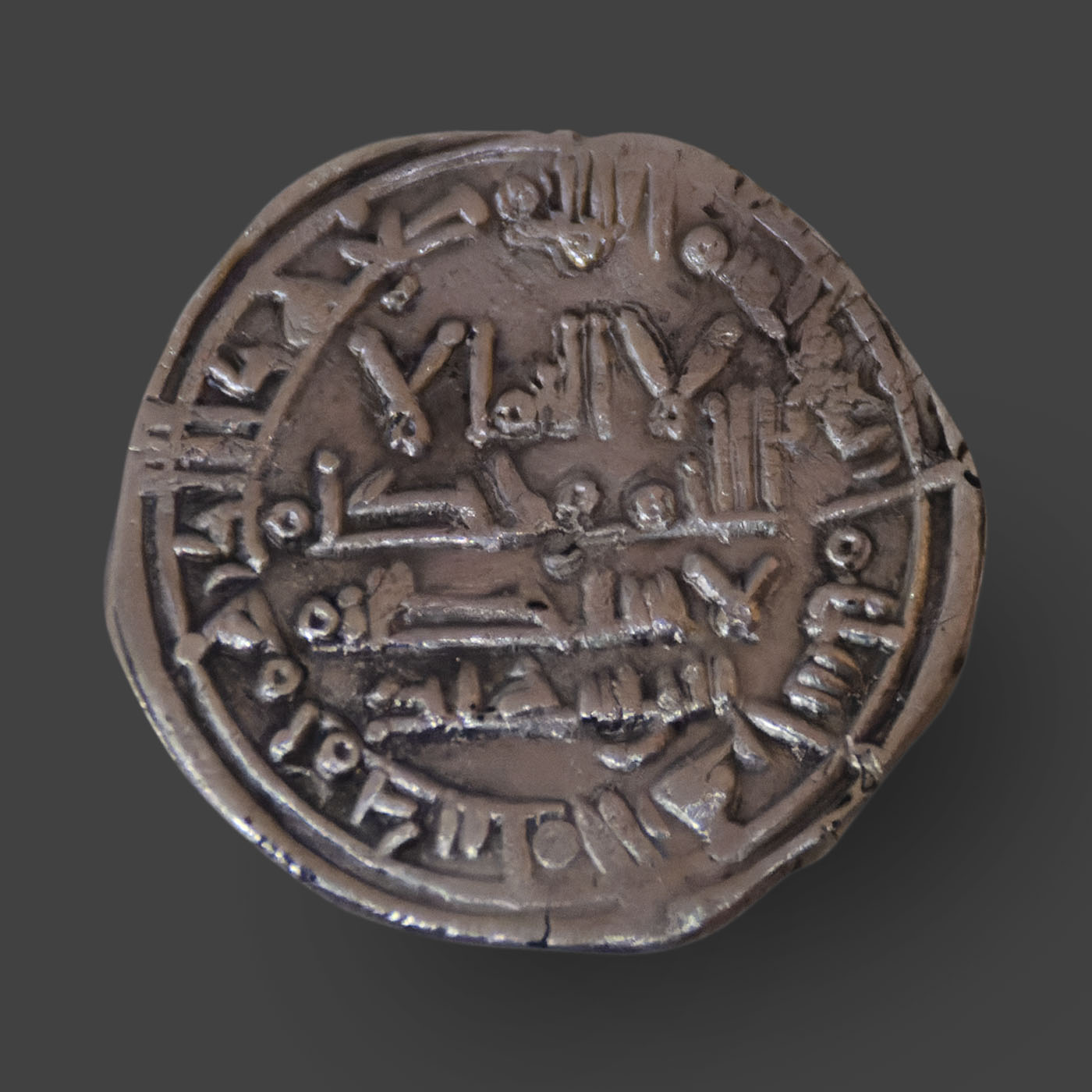
- Silver Dirham of Sulayman al-Musta'in, minted in Madinat al-Zahra (Córdoba) in 1009 AD

5th Caliph of Córdoba (first period)
- Reign: 1009 – 1010
- Predecessor: Muhammad II
- Successor: Hisham II

(second period)
- Reign: 1013 – 1016
- Predecessor: Hisham II
- Successor: Ali ibn Hammud al-Nasir
- Born: 965; Cordoba, Caliphate of Córdoba
- Died: 1016 (aged 50–51); Cordoba, Caliphate of Córdoba
Names
- Sulaymān ibn al-Hakam ibn Sulaymān ibn Abd ar-Rahman
- Dynasty: Umayyad (Marwanid)
- Father: Al-Hakam ibn Sulaymān ibn Abd ar-Rahman III
- Mother: Thabiya
- Religion: Islam

Sulaymān ibn al-Hakam or Sulaymān al-Musta'in bi-llah (Arabic: سلیمان المستعین باللہ; died 1016) was the fifth Caliph of Córdoba, ruling from 1009 to 1010, and from 1013 to 1016 in Al-Andalus.

In February 1009, Muhammad II ibn Hisham led a revolt against caliph Hisham II al-Hakam and imprisoned him, taking advantage of the fact that the Caliphate's military leader, Abd al-Rahman Sanchuelo was fighting in León against the Christian king Alfonso V. Muhammad II captured the capital city of Córdoba and took the throne as caliph. As caliph, Muhammad II initiated systemic persecution of the resident Berbers resulting ultimately in their general expulsion.

Many of the Berbers fled from the city of Córdoba north to Calatrava, where they proclaimed Sulaymān as their candidate to reclaim the Caliphate. In that effort, Sulaymān took command of an army of Berbers and Castilians by means of an alliance with count Sancho García of Castile. After defeating the Córdobans at Alcalá de Henares, Sulaymān and his army campaigned to the south nearing the city of Córdoba in November. Pushing on toward the city, Sulaymān defeated the forces of Muhammad II, first at Qantish on 5 November and then at the battle of the bridge over the Guadalquivir River at Alcolea on 8 November. After being defeated, Muhammad II fled to Toledo. Sulaymān completed his campaign and entered Córdoba on 9 November, 1009. Sulaymān then allowed the city to be sacked by the Berbers and Castilians.

After capturing the city, Sulaymān freed Hisham II from imprisonment and reinstated him as caliph. After a few days, however, Sulaymān deposed Hisham II and was elected caliph by his Berber troops, assuming the title (laqab) of al-Musta'in bi-llah ("He Who Seeks for God's Help").

In May 1010, Muhammad II, who had fled to Toledo months earlier, completed the reinforcement of his exiled military with "slave" mercenaries from all over Europe by allying with Count Ramon Borrell of Barcelona. With his renewed army, Muhammad II defeated Sulaymān and recaptured Córdoba. Muhammad II took the throne again as caliph.

After he had withdrawn to Algeciras, Sulaymān managed to repulse Muhammad and Catalan attack, Muhammad withdrew to Córdoba but was executed by his mercenaries later, who managed to restore Hisham II, Sulayman besieged Córdoba and reconquered it in 1013 with Berber help, and depose Hisham II. His policy of concessions to Berbers, Arab and "slave" troops and leaders, effectively reduced the caliphate's authority to only Córdoba. In the meantime the Zirids of Granada formed an independent dynasty. In 1016 Córdoba was attacked by a large Berber army under the Hammudid governor of Ceuta, Ali ibn Hammud al-Nasir, who conquered it on 1 July 1016. Sulaymān was imprisoned and, shortly afterwards, beheaded.

== Sources ==
- Altamira, Rafael (1999). "Il califfato occidentale". Storia del mondo medievale. Vol. II. pp. 477–515.

Sulayman ibn al-Hakam Banu Umayyah Cadet branch of the Banu Quraish
Preceded by Muhammad II	Caliph of Córdoba; 1009–1010	Succeeded by Hisham II
Preceded by Hisham II	Caliph of Córdoba; 1013–1016	Succeeded by Ali ibn Hammud al-Nasir
