= Muhammad II of Córdoba =

Caliph of Córdoba during 1009

Mohammed II al-Mahdi محمد بن هشام بن عبد الجبار
- al-Mahdī bi'llah

4th Caliph of Córdoba
- Reign: February 1009
- Predecessor: Hisham II
- Successor: Sulayman ibn al-Hakam
- Born: 976; Córdoba, Caliphate of Córdoba
- Died: 23 June 1010; Córdoba, Caliphate of Córdoba
- Dynasty: Umayyad (Marwanid)
- Father: Hisham bin Abd al-Jabbar bin Abd ar-Rahman III
- Mother: Muzna
- Religion: Islam

Muhammad II al-Mahdi (Arabic: محمد المهدي بالله, romanized: Muḥammad al-Mahdī bi-ʾllāh) was the fourth Caliph of Córdoba of the Umayyad dynasty in Al-Andalus (Moorish Iberia).

In early 1009, Muhammad II, an Umayyad prince and pretender to the throne of Córdoba, rose to power, led a rebellion against the existing Caliph, ultimately deposing and imprisoning Hisham II. Muhammad II then took the throne for himself but oppressed, slaughtered, and ultimately expelled many resident Berbers from the city. Great numbers of alienated Berbers traveled north to Calatrava where they regrouped, created a fighting force and selected Sulayman ibn al-Hakam as their candidate for caliph.

Months later in November 1009, Sulayman led a Berber and Castilian army in a effort to retake the throne. In his campaign, Sulayman defeated the forces of Muhammad II in battles at Qantish and Alcolea Bridge. Sulayman entered the capital city of Córdoba on 9 November and reclaimed the Caliphate while Muhammad II and his loyalists fled to Toledo.

In Toledo with the assistance of his prime minister Wāḍiḥ al-Ṣiqlabī, Muhammad II began working to rebuild his army. Wāḍiḥ ultimately established a military alliance with some of the Ṣaqāliba in the east, along with Frankish counts Ramon Borrell of Barcelona and Ermengol I of Urgell.

With a reinforced army, Muhammad II marched to the south intent upon taking the Caliphate from Sulayman. The Berber army of Sulaymān attempted to intercept the military force of Muhammad II and the two armies met and battled at Espiel on 22 May 1010. Sulayman’s Berber force was defeated. Muhammad II and his Frank allies won a major victory and advanced to the city of Córdoba. Muhammad was once again installed as Caliph while Sulayman withdrew to most southern region of Al-Andalus.

In Córdoba, Muhammad II attempted to gain the support of the Berbers but his regime remained unstable. Muhammad II then decided to pursue Sulayman and the Berbers by means of a military strike to the south. This venture ended poorly as Wāḍiḥ and the Frankish allies ware defeated in June 1010 in battles at Marbella and Guadiaro.

In the chaos that followed, the Ṣaqāliba faction under al-Wāḍiḥ decided to abandon Muhammad II and work for the restoration of Hisham II to power. The Frankish alliance fell apart and the Franks left for home. Wāḍiḥ returned to Córdoba and orchestrated a coup.

Facing a coup, Muhammad II attempted to flee Córdoba, reportedly disguised as a woman. He was arrested by Wāḍiḥ, put on trial, and executed on June 23, 1010.

After his death, later Muslim historians also accused him of taking women from the Amirid harem during the 1009 revolution.

== Citations ==
Muhammad II of Córdoba Banu Umayyah Cadet branch of the Banu Quraish
Preceded by Hisham II	Caliph of Córdoba; 1009	Succeeded by Sulayman ibn al-Hakam
