= Hisham II of Córdoba =

Caliph of Córdoba (r. 976–1009; 1010–1013)

Hisham II ھشام المؤيد بالله
- Khalifah; Amir al-Mu'minīn
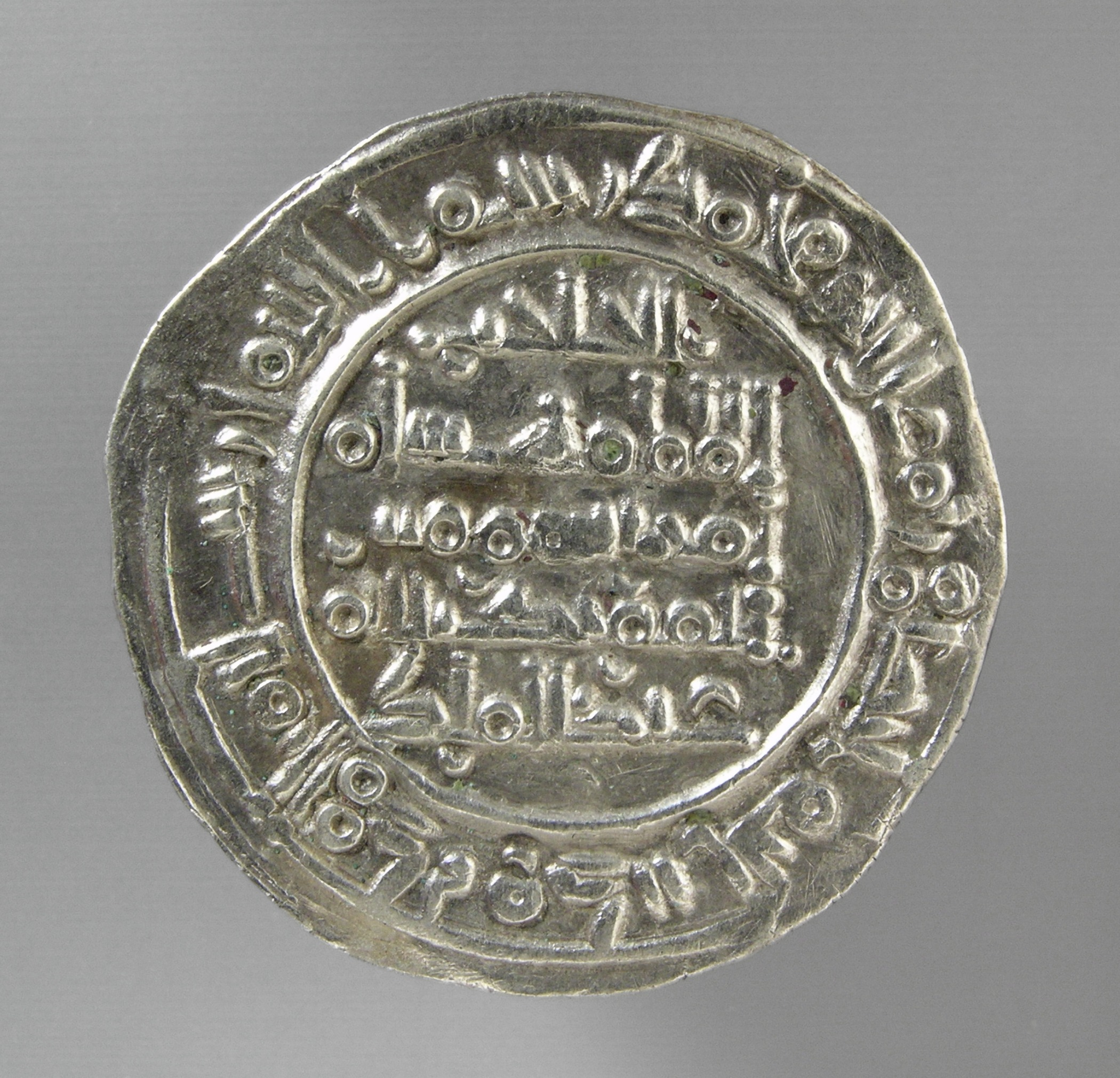
- Silver Dirham of Hisham II, minted in Córdoba in 393 AH (1002 AD)

3rd Caliph of Córdoba
- 1st reign: 16 October 976 – 15 February 1009
- Predecessor: Al-Hakam II
- Successor: Muhammad II
- 2nd reign: 23 July 1010 – 19 April 1013
- Predecessor: Sulayman ibn al-Hakam
- Successor: Sulaymān ibn al-Hakam
- Born: 966; Córdoba
- Died: 1013; Córdoba
- Dynasty: Umayyad
- Father: Al-Hakam II
- Mother: Subh
- Religion: Islam

Abu'l-Walid Hishām al-Muʾayyad bi-llāh (أبو الوليد هشام المؤيد بالله; 966 – c. 1013), better known as Hisham II, was the third Umayyad caliph of Córdoba, ruling Al-Andalus from 976 to 1009 and again from 1010 to 1013. He was the son of Al-Hakam II and Subh of Córdoba.

== Reign ==
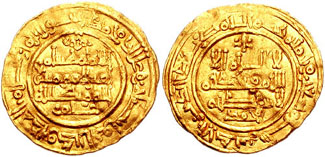
Gold dinar of Hisham II al-Mu'ayyad bi-llah, First reign, (976–1009) al-Andalus (Córdoba) mint. Dated (AH 396) 1006/7 AD

In 976, at the age of 10, Hisham II succeeded his father Al-Hakam II as Caliph of Córdoba. Hisham II was a minor at the time of his accession and therefore unfit to rule. In order to benefit the Caliphate, his mother Subh was aided by first minister Jafar al-Mushafi to act as regents with Abu ʿĀmir Muḥammad (better known as "Almanzor") as her steward. In 978 Almanzor manipulated his way into the position of royal chamberlain. In an attempt to position himself as a prospective ruler of the Caliphate, Almanzor and General Ghalib al-Siklabi sabotaged the brother of Al-Hakam II who was set to succeed his brother and become the next Caliph of Córdoba. Still too young to rule, Hisham II handed the reins of power over to Almanzor in 981, who became the de facto leader of the Caliphate until his death in 1002.

Almanzor perpetuated his position as the omnipotent ruler in charge of the empire while he exiled Hisham II and essentially kept him prisoner for most of his reign. With his countless successful campaigns against Christian powers in the Spanish North such as Barcelona in 985, León in 988, as well as a major strike on the church of St. James in the Galician city of Santiago de Compostela in 998, Almanzor is known for bringing the Caliphate of Córdoba to its apex of power in Islamic Iberian history.

In 1002, after the death of Almanzor, his son Abd al-Malik became the ruler of the Caliphate and led successful campaigns against Navarre and Barcelona. In October 1008 Abd al-Malik died, potentially poisoned by his brother Abd al-Rahman Sanchuelo. In February 1009, while Abd al-Rahman Sanchuelo was waging war against Alfonso V in León, Muhammad II al-Mahdi, a member of another branch of the Umayyad dynasty, usurped the throne from Hisham II and held him hostage in Córdoba.

On 9 November 1009, just months after taking control of the Caliphate, Muhammad II was overthrown by a Berber and Castilian army when another relative, Sulayman ibn al-Hakam led those forces into the capital city of Córdoba, forcing Muhammad II to flee to Toledo. After capturing the city, Sulayman freed Hisham II from imprisonment and reinstated him as caliph. After a few days, however, Sulayman deposed Hisham II and was elected caliph by his Berber troops, assuming the title (laqab) of al-Musta'in bi-llah ("He Who Seeks for God's Help"). Hisham II was placed under close guard and removed entirely from the machinery of government.

Sulayman remained caliph only until May 1010 when Muhammad II defeated Sulayman's Berber army at the Battle of Aqbat al-Bakr. After the battle, Muhammad II advanced to Córdoba where he was once again installed as caliph while Sulayman withdrew to the southern region of Al-Andalus. Hisham II was not restored to power by Muhammad II but remained a political pawn in the ongoing civil war.

Approximately one month later, Muhammad II was removed from power in a coup by his Chamberlain, Wadih al-Siqlabi. Muhammad II attempted to flee Córdoba, reportedly disguised as a woman. He was ultimately arrested by Wāḍiḥ, put on trial, and executed on June 23, 1010. Hisham II was then restored to his position of caliph and he subsequently appointed Wāḍiḥ as his Chamberlain. So as it had been in the past, Hisham II was only the titular head of the Caliphate with the real power held by others.

Approximately four months later in November 1010, Sulayman and the Berbers began a siege of Córdoba that would last for two and a half years. During that time, Hisham II took a more active role interacting with the people of Córdoba encouraging them to defend the city and themselves. In May 1013, the Berbers accepted the surrender of a weak and desperate city. By that time Wāḍiḥ had been executed for treason. Sulayman was once again appointed Caliph. Hisham II's fate is unclear. Some historians believe that he was killed by the Berbers. Other historians believed he escaped and went into exile.

== Revival under the taifa kings ==
Due to his disappearance, and hence his possible survival, Hisham II was revived as a symbol of legitimacy by the taifa kings who appeared following the definitive collapse of the caliphate: in 1035, the ruler of the Taifa of Seville, Abu al-Qasim Muhammad ibn Abbad, announced that Hisham had reappeared, and declared his allegiance to him. Other taifas falling under Seville's sway during the following years followed suit. It was not until 1060 that the Sevillan ruler Abbad II al-Mu'tadid acknowledged that this supposed Hisham had died in 1044 without a successor, but the "convenient fiction" of his survival lasted until at least 1082–83, when his name still appears in the coins of the Taifa of Zaragoza.

== See also ==
- Jacob ibn Jau

== Bibliography ==
- Adang, Camilla; Fierro, Maribel; Schmidtke, Sabine (2012). Ibn Ḥazm of Córdoba: The Life and Works of a Controversial Thinker. BRILL. ISBN 978-90-04-24310-1.
- Brill, E.J. (1993). First Encyclopaedia of Islam: 1913-1936, Volume 3. BRILL. ISBN 978-9004097964.
- Bury, John Bagnell (1922). "The Cambridge Medieval History vol 3 - Germany and the Western Empire".
- Clarke, Nicola (2 January 2016). "Heirs and Spares: Elite Fathers and Their Sons in the Literary Sources of Umayyad Iberia". Al-Masāq. 28 (1): 67–83. doi:10.1080/09503110.2016.1152805. S2CID 146870151.
- Flood, Timothy M. (2018-11-09). Rulers and Realms in Medieval Iberia, 711-1492. McFarland. ISBN 978-1-4766-3372-5.
- Kennedy, Hugh (2014). Muslim Spain and Portugal, A Political History of al-Andalud. Abingdon, Oxon: Routledge. ISBN 978-0-582-49515-9.
- Scales, Peter C. (1994). The Fall of the Caliphate of Córdoba: Berbers and Andalusis in Conflict. E. J. Brill.
- Catlos, Brian A. (2018). Kingdoms of faith: a new history of Islamic Spain (1st ed.). New York: Basic Books. pp. 176–179. ISBN 978-0-465-05587-6.

Hisham II of Córdoba Umayyads of Córdoba Cadet branch of the Umayyad dynasty
Preceded by al-Hakam II	Caliph of Córdoba; 976–1009	Succeeded by Muhammad II
Preceded by Sulayman ibn al-Hakam	Caliph of Córdoba; 1010–1013	Succeeded by Sulayman ibn al-Hakam
