= List of 11th-century religious leaders =

This is a list of the top-level leaders for religious groups with at least 50,000 adherents, and that led anytime from January 1, 1001, to December 31, 1100. It should likewise only name leaders listed on other articles and lists.

== Christianity ==
- Church of Rome (complete list) –

- Sylvester II, Pope (999–1003)
- John XVII, Pope (1003)
- John XVIII, Pope (1003–1009)
- Sergius IV, Pope (1009–1012)
- Benedict VIII, Pope (1012–1024)
- John XIX, Pope (1024–1032)
- Benedict IX, Pope (1032–1044, 1045, 1047–1048)
- Sylvester III, Pope (1056–1062)
- Benedict IX, Pope (1032–1044, 1045, 1047–1048)
- Gregory VI, Pope (1045–1046)
- Clement II, Pope (1046–1047)
- Benedict IX, Pope (1032–1044, 1045, 1047–1048)
- Damasus II, Pope (1048)
- Leo IX, Pope (1049–1054)
- Victor II, Pope (1055–1057)
- Stephen IX, Pope (1057–1058)
- Nicholas II, Pope (1059–1061)
- Alexander II, Pope (1061–1073)
- Gregory VII, Pope (1073–1085)
- Victor III, Pope (1086–1087)
- Urban II, Pope (1088–1099)
- Paschal II, Pope (1099–1118)

- Church of Constantinople (complete list) –

- Sergius II, Patriarch (1001–1019)
- Eustathius, Patriarch (1019–1025)
- Alexius I the Studite, Patriarch (1025–1043)
- Michael I Cerularius, Patriarch (1043–1058)

- The first among equals in Eastern Orthodoxy after the East–West Schism of 1054

- Constantine III Leichoudes, Ecumenical Patriarch (1059–1063)
- John VIII Xiphilinos, Ecumenical Patriarch (1064–1075)
- Kosmas I, Ecumenical Patriarch (1075–1081)
- Eustratius Garidas, Ecumenical Patriarch (1081–1084)
- Nicholas III Grammaticus, Ecumenical Patriarch (1084–1111)

== Islam ==
=== Sunni ===
- Abbasids, Baghdad (complete list) –

- al-Qadir, Caliph (991–1031)
- al-Qa'im, Caliph (1031–1075)
- al-Muqtadi, Caliph (1075–1094)
- al-Mustazhir, Caliph (1094–1118)

- Islamic Spain (complete list) –

- Hisham II, (976–1008, 1010–1012)
- Muhammad II, (1008–1009)
- Sulayman ibn al-Hakam, (1009–1010, 1012–1017)
- Abd ar-Rahman IV, (1021–1022)
- Abd ar-Rahman V, (1022–1023)
- Muhammad III, (1023–1024)
- Hisham III, (1027–1031)

=== Shia ===
- Twelver Islam

- Imams (complete list) –
- Muhammad al-Mahdi, Imam (874–present) Shia belief holds that he was hidden by Allah in 874.

- Marja

- Al-Sharif al-Radi (993-1015)
- Shaykh Mufid (1005-1025)
- Sayyid Murtadhā, Alam al Huda (1025-1044)
- Shaykh Tusi (1044-1068)
- Ibn Barraj (1068-1088)
- Ibn-e-Haddād (1085-1097)

- Isma'ili Islam (complete list) –

- al-Hakim bi-Amr Allah, Caliph and Imam (996–1021)
- ali az-Zahir, Caliph and Imam (1021–1036)
- al-Mustansir Billah, Caliph and Imam (1036–1094)
- The succession was disputed after al-Mustansir Billah's death, leading to a schism which created the Nizari branch

- Musta'li line

- al-Musta'li, Caliph and Imam (1094–1101)

- Nizari line (complete list) –

- Nizar, Imam (1094–1095)
- Ali al-Hadi, Imam (1095–?) in occultation

- De facto leader: Hassan-i Sabbah, da'i (1095–1124)

- Zaidiyyah (complete list) –

- al-Mansur al-Qasim al-Iyyani, Imam (999–1002)
- ad-Da'i Yusuf, Imam (1002–1012)
- al-Mahdi al-Husayn, Imam (1003–1013)
- al-Mu'ayyad Ahmad, Imam (1013–1020)
- Abu Talib Yahya, Imam (1020–1033)
- al-Mu’id li-Din Illah, Imam (1027–1030)
- Abu Hashim al-Hasan, Imam (1031–1040)
- Abu'l-Fath an-Nasir ad-Dailami, Imam (1038–1053)
- al-Muhtasib al-Mujahid Hamzah, Imam (1060–1067)

== Judaism ==
=== Karaite Judaism ===
- Exilarch (complete list) –
  Solomon ben David (late 10th–early 11th centuries)
  Hezekiah ben Solomon (11th century)
  Hasdai ben Hezekiah (11th–12th centuries)

=== Talmudic Academies in Mesopotamia ===
- Pumbedita Academy (complete list) –

- Sherira Gaon, Gaon (968–1006)
- Hai Gaon, Gaon (1004–1038)
- Hezekiah Gaon, Gaon and Exilarch (1038–1040)

- Sura Academy (complete list) –

- Samuel ben Hofni, Gaon (c.998–c.1012)
- Dosa ben Saadia Gaon, Gaon (1012–1018)
- Israel ha-Kohen ben Samuel ben Hofni, Gaon (1018–1033)

== See also ==
- Religious leaders by year
- List of state leaders in the 11th century
- Lists of colonial governors by century
