= 1023 =

Calendar year

1023 in various calendars
Gregorian calendar	1023; MXXIII
Ab urbe condita	1776
Armenian calendar	472; ԹՎ ՆՀԲ
Assyrian calendar	5773
Balinese saka calendar	944–945
Bengali calendar	429–430
Berber calendar	1973
English Regnal year	N/A
Buddhist calendar	1567
Burmese calendar	385
Byzantine calendar	6531–6532
Chinese calendar	壬戌年 (Water Dog); 3720 or 3513 — to — 癸亥年 (Water Pig); 3721 or 3514
Coptic calendar	739–740
Discordian calendar	2189
Ethiopian calendar	1015–1016
Hebrew calendar	4783–4784
- Hindu calendars
Vikram Samvat	1079–1080
Shaka Samvat	944–945
Kali Yuga	4123–4124
Holocene calendar	11023
Igbo calendar	23–24
Iranian calendar	401–402
Islamic calendar	413–414
Japanese calendar	Jian 3 (治安３年)
Javanese calendar	925–926
Julian calendar	1023; MXXIII
Korean calendar	3356
Minguo calendar	889 before ROC 民前889年
Nanakshahi calendar	−445
Seleucid era	1334/1335 AG
Thai solar calendar	1565–1566
Tibetan calendar	ཆུ་ཕོ་ཁྱི་ལོ་ (male Water-Dog); 1149 or 768 or −4 — to — ཆུ་མོ་ཕག་ལོ་ (female Water-Boar); 1150 or 769 or −3

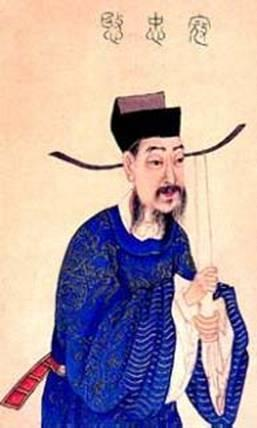
Kou Zhun (Pingzhong) (c. 961–1023)

Year 1023 (MXXIII) was a common year starting on Tuesday of the Julian calendar.

== Events ==
=== January–March ===
- January 16 – (21 Shawwal 413 AH) The Grand Vizier of the Fatimid Caliphate in Egypt is executed only nine months after succeeding Khatir-al-Mulk.
- January 24 – A solar eclipse is visible from London.
- February 5 – At Cairo in the Fatimid Caliphate, the Caliph al-Zahir li-I'zaz Din Allah attains full power upon the death of his aunt, Sitt al-Mulk.
- February 12 – (18 Dhu-I-qa'da 413 AH) In Spain, Al-Ma'mun al-Qāsim ibn Ḥammud returns to Córdoba to become the new Emir, after the Emir Yaḥya ibn ʿAli ibn Ḥammud al-Muʿtali bi-llāh leaves the city and moves to Málaga. Al-Qasim reigns for 10 months before being forced out by Abd al-Rahman V.
- February 23 – The Chitragupta Temple (now in India at Khajuraho at the Madhya Pradesh state) is consecrated to the Hindu god Shiva, at the Maha Shivaratri celebration.
- March 27 – Gebhard von Hohenwart becomes the new Bishop of Regensburg in Bavaria, upon the death of Gebhard of Swabia.
- March – Musharrif al-Dawla, ruler of Iraq, comes to Baghdad to see the Abbasid Caliph al-Qadir, and attempts to defy the caliphate.

=== April–June ===
- April 10 – Al-Hasan ibn Muhammad ibn Thu'ban becomes the new Emir of Halab (in what is now northern Syria) after Safiyy al-Dawla is dismissed by the Caliph al-Hakim.
- May 11 – In the Kingdom of León in Spain, the Abbot Oliba declines to authorize the wedding of King Alfonso V to Urraca Garcés, the sister of King Sancho of Pamplona, describing it as incesti connubii. The wedding takes place anyway.
- May 16 – From his capital at Mainz in Germany, Henry II, Holy Roman Emperor, issues a grant of lands in Tragoess (now in Austria) to the Göss Abbey.
- June 15 – (17th day before the kalends of July) The body of the late Ælfheah of Canterbury, the former Archbishop of Canterbury who will later be canonized as a Roman Catholic saint and a martyr of the church, is reburied at Canterbury Cathedral on orders of England's King Canute, after being moved from St. Paul's Cathedral in London on June 12 (the 3rd day before the ides of June). King Canute, whose Danish troops had murdered Archbishop Ælfheah on April 19, 1012, during Canute's invasion of England, has ordered the reburial as an atonement for Ælfheah's death.

=== July–September ===
- July 20 – A partial solar eclipse, part of the Solar Saros 120 cycle, is visible to the natives of southern South America in what are now Brazil, Uruguay and Chile.
- August 11 – King Robert II of France and Henry II, Holy Roman Emperor have a neutral site meeting at Ivois (now Carignan in France's département of Ardennes), and pledge to convene an assembly at Pavia to reform the clergy.
- September 14 – Rudolph III, King of Burgundy and his wife, Queen Ermengard, grant the county of Viennois to the Archbishop of Vienne.

=== October–December ===
- October 18 – Al-Mu'izz ibn Badis becomes the full ruler of Ifriqiya (modern day Tunisia) upon the death of his aunt, Umm Mallal, who had served as regent since 1016.
- November 13 – The marriage of King Alfonso V of León to Princess Urraca of Pamplona is confirmed by the Roman Catholic Church.
- December 2 – Abd al-Rahman V becomes the Muslim Caliph of Córdoba in what is now most of the southern two-thirds of Spain and Portugal by overthrowing Al-Qasim al-Ma'mun, but only serves for six weeks until his assassination by Muhammad III.
- December – Abbad I declares the Taifa of Seville independent from Córdoban rule. Abd ar-Rahman V is proclaimed Caliph at Córdoba.

=== By place ===
==== Europe ====
- The Judge-Governor of Seville in Al-Andalus (modern Spain) takes advantage of the disintegration of the Caliphate of Córdoba and seizes power as Abbad I, founding the Abbadid dynasty.

==== Asia ====
- April/May (Jian 3, 4th month) – An epidemic in Kyoto (Japan) is so severe that there are corpses in the streets; disease spreads throughout the country.
- 60th birthday and longevity ceremony of Japanese matriarch Minamoto no Rinshi, wife of Fujiwara no Michinaga.
- The Ghaznavid Empire occupies Transoxiana (approximate date).

=== By topic ===
==== Religion ====
- The Dom Church at Utrecht (modern Netherlands) is severely damaged by fire. Bishop Adalbold II begins construction of a new Romanesque style church.

== Births ==
- Lý Thánh Tông, Vietnamese emperor (d. 1072)
- Otto I (or Odon), count of Savoy (approximate date)
- Ramon Berenguer I, count of Barcelona (d. 1076)
- William VII ("the Bold"), duke of Aquitaine (d. 1058)

== Deaths ==
- March 27 – Gebhard I, bishop of Regensburg
- May 28 – Wulfstan (or Lupus), archbishop of York
- October 18 – Zirid princess and regent
- October 21 – Gero, archbishop of Magdeburg
- October 24 – Kou Zhun, Chinese grand chancellor
- November 24 – Eilward, bishop of Dresden-Meissen
- December 5 – Hartwig, archbishop of Salzburg
- Abū Hayyān al-Tawhīdī, Muslim intellectual (b. 923)
- Godfrey II, count and duke of Lower Lorraine (b. 965)
- Llywelyn ap Seisyll, king of Gwynedd and Powys
- Oda of Haldensleben, duchess of the Polans
- Sitt al-Mulk, Fatimid princess and regent (b. 970)
