= Hisham III of Córdoba =

Caliph of Córdoba from 1026 to 1031

Hisham bin Muhammad bin 'Abd al-Malik هشام بن محمد بن عبد الملك

Last and 11th Caliph of Córdoba
- Reign: 1027–1031
- Predecessor: Muhammad III
- Successor: Title extinct
- Born: c. 973
- Died: 1036 (aged 62–63); Balaguer
Names
- Hisham bin Muhammad bin 'Abd al-Malik bin Abd al-Rahman bin Muhammad
- Dynasty: Umayyad (Marwanid)
- Father: Muhammad bin 'Abd al-Malik bin Abd ar-Rahman III
- Mother: 'Ateb
- Religion: Sunni Islam

Hisham III (Arabic: هشام الثالث in full المعتد بالله” هشام بن محمد) was the last Umayyad ruler in the Al-Andalus (Moorish Iberia) (1027–1031), and the last person to hold the title Caliph of Córdoba.

== Background ==
In 1025, Yahya ibn Ali marched on Córdoba. Caliph Muhammad III was on the throne, however he was weak, lazy and uninspiring. On the approach of Yahya, Muhammad III fled. After Muhammad III fled the capital city, the Córdoban aristocracy created a council to govern the city in his absence. After approximately six months, however, they appealed to Yahya to come to the city and assume the title of caliph. He arrived on 9 November 1025. The city, however, was no longer a prize. The treasury was empty. There was no functioning government. There was no military or police to enforce laws. The city had no regional influence outside the city walls. Yahya as a result had no interest in assuming the position of caliph choosing instead to put the city in the hands of his vizier Abu Ja`far Ahmad ben Musa while he returned to his stronghold of Málaga.

Unhappy that the Hammudids ruled the Caliphate again, regional Slavic rulers assembled a small army; removed Yahya's vizier and forces from the city; and departed without putting their own leadership in place. The aristocracy took control again and after long negotiations between the governors of the border regions and the people of Córdoba, Hisham III of Córdoba, the brother of Abd ar-Rahman IV, was chosen as Caliph in June 1027.

== Reign ==
Hisham III did not immediately leave his home in Alpuente, but delayed until December 1029 as the capital city remained occupied by the Berber armies of the Hammudids.

Although Hisham III attempted to consolidate the Caliphate, he was not a good administrator. As his prime minister, Hisham III chose Hakam ibn Sa'id. Sa'id failed to conduct the affairs of the Caliphate in an effective manner as he spend too much of his time indulging the excesses of Hisham III. Actions such as raising of taxes even directed in part to pay for mosques led to heavy opposition from the Muslim clerics and gave rise in 1031 to a Umayyad pretender to the throne, Umayya ibn Abd al-Rahman. Umayya promised to dethrone Hisham III and attracted disgruntled militia men who ambushed and killed Sa'id on 30 November 1031.

The murder of Sa'id initiated an uprising against Hisham III for incompetency. Hisham III was imprisoned and the riot somewhat quelled. The aristocracy, however, decided that Hisham III should leave the city. Hisham left the city and died in exile in 1036 in Balaguer.

After the Caliphate fell with the overthrow of Hisham III in 1031, the Caliphate's land holdings—already much diminished from its height in power just 100 years past—devolved into a number of militarily weak but culturally advanced taifas.

== Citations ==
Hisham III of Córdoba Umayyads of Córdoba Cadet branch of the Umayyad dynasty Died: 1036
Preceded by Muhammad III	Caliph of Córdoba; 1026–1031	Succeeded by Abū 'l Ḥazm Jahwar bin Muḥammad (as Custodian of Córdoba)
Titles in pretence
New title	Umayyad Leader; 1031–1036	Title extinct
