= Taifa of Algeciras =

Medieval Muslim taifa kingdom

Coordinates: 36.1333°N 5.4500°W

Taifa of Algeciras طائفة الجزيرة (Arabic)
- 1035–1058
- Taifa Kingdom of Algeciras, c. 1037.
- Capital: Algeciras
- Common languages: Arabic, Mozarabic, Hebrew
- Religion: Islam, Catholicism, Judaism
- Government: Monarchy
- Emir
  - 1035–1048: Muhammad ibn al-Qasim
  - 1048–1058: al-Qasim al-Wathiq
- Historical era: Middle Ages
  - Downfall of Caliphate of Córdoba: 1035
  - Conquered by the Taifa of Seville: 1058
- Currency: Dirham and Dinar
Preceded by	Succeeded by
Caliphate of Cordoba	Taifa of Seville
- Today part of: Spain; Gibraltar

The Taifa of Algeciras (Arabic: طائفة الجزيرة) was a medieval Muslim taifa kingdom in what is now southern Spain and Gibraltar, that existed from 1035 to 1058.

== History ==
The taifa was created in 1013, in the wake of the disintegration of the caliphate of Córdoba which began after 1009. When Sulayman ibn al-Hakam took control of the caliphate, he gave Algeciras to the Hammudids, a dynasty who had helped him in gaining the power. The first king of Algeciras was al-Qasim al-Ma'mun, who later was also caliph.

His cousin Yahya al-Mu'tali annexed Algeciras to the taifa of Málaga in 1035. In 1039 Muhammad ibn al-Qasim, son of al-Qasim, was proclaimed emir of Algeciras.

In 1055 al-Mu'tamid ibn Abbad, lord of Seville, appeared under Algeciras' walls, forcing Muhammad to leave the taifa, which was annexed to that of Seville.

Following its conquest, the kings of Spain (such as Philip IV) sometimes included the kingdom of Algeciras among their titles.

== List of Emirs ==
- Muhammad ibn al-Qasim: 1035–1048
- al-Qasim al-Wathiq: 1048–1058

== See also ==
- List of Sunni Muslim dynasties
