= Taifa of Ceuta =

The Taifa of Ceuta (Arabic: طائفة سبتة) was one of the taifa states formed after the breakup of the Caliphate of Córdoba in the early 11th century. The cities of Ceuta (Arabic: Sabta) and Tangiers were a part of the Ḥammūdid dynasty taifa of Málaga from 1026. From 1036 (427 AH) it was governed on behalf of the Ḥammūdids by the Barghawāṭa, a Berber tribe with a non-Islamic religion. Shortly before 1061 (453 AH), the Barghawāṭa, led by the illiterate Saqqūt, took power from the Ḥammūdids. They could field a large army of 12,000 cavalry, but were defeated and conquered by the rising power of the Almoravids in 1078–79.
