= Abu Talib Yahya =

Zaidi Imam (951 - 1033)

Abu Talib Yahya (951 - 1033) was an imam of the Zaydiyyah sect in 1020–1033.

Like his elder brother and predecessor al-Mu'ayyad Ahmad, Abu Talib Yahya was a prominent man of learning and a descendant of Imam Hasan bin Ali. He succeeded al-Mu'ayyad Ahmad in the imamate of the Zaidi territories in Gilan and Deylaman in Persia, formally as "caliph". At this time there were two major Zaidi territories, namely the area south of the Caspian Sea and the highlands of Yemen. For many years after the death of imam al-Mahdi al-Husayn in 1013, no local imam was appointed in the Yemeni territory. In Zaidi historiography, al-Mu'ayyad Ahmad and Abu Talib Yahya are sometimes listed as such, although they never visited Yemen.

== See also ==
- Imams of Yemen

Preceded by al-Mu'ayyad Ahmad	Zaydi Imam of Yemen during interregnum in Yemen; 1020–1033	Succeeded by Al-Mu'id li-Din Allah (claimant) and Abu Hashim al-Hasan
