= Abu'l-Fath an-Nasir ad-Dailami =

Zaydi imam of Yemen from c. 1038 to 1053

Abu'l-Fath an-Nasir ad-Dailami (died 1053) was an imam of the Zaidi state in Yemen who ruled from c. 1038 to 1053.

== Genealogy ==
1. Imam Ali al-Murtada
2. Imam Hasan al-Mujtaba
3. Zayd
4. al-Hasan
5. Ali
6. Abdullah
7. Ahmad
8. Abdullah
9. Muhammad
10. Isa
11. Muhammad
12. al-Husayn
13. Abu'l-Fath al-Nasir al-Dailimi

== From Deylaman to Yemen ==
Abu'l-Fath was a Sayyid but not a member of the dynasty of the Rassids. He traced his descent from Zaid bin al-Hasan bin Ali, grandson of the caliph Ali. He was born and raised in Deylaman south of the Caspian Sea where there was also a Zaydiyyah congregation, hence his cognomen ad-Dailami. Abu'l-Fath arrived to Yemen in 1038 or later, and claimed the Zaidi imamate. In 1046 the tribesmen of Hamdan accepted him, and he was able to seize Sa'dah and San'a in the same year. The new ruler set out to organize the Yemeni highland, appointing officials and collecting land taxes and zakat. As his permanent residence, he used a fortified mountain near Dhibin. In 1047 several further highland groups submitted to Abu'l-Fath, including the emir Ja'far, brother of imam al-Mahdi al-Husayn and leader of the Husayniyya Zaidi sect.

== Sulayhid victory ==
However, the power of the imam rested on shaky ground. Ja'far and the Hamdan chief Ibn Abi Hashid soon fell out with him, and he lost San'a again. Abu'l-Fath withdrew to his stronghold in Dhibin where he fought Ja'far. His powers were further eclipsed by the Shi'ite Sulayhid Dynasty which began to expand in the highlands. Abu'l-Fath had to move from place to place, and tried to enlist the support of the Mamluk Najahid dynasty in Zabid. In 1053 (or, in another account, 1055) the Sulayhid forces overcame the imam at Najd-al-Jah, and he was killed with 70 followers. The slain imam was buried in Radman in the Ans region, and his grave was subsequently the object of veneration by pilgrims. Among his writings, one may mention two qur'anic commentaries, and a collection of answers to legal and theological questions. Some of his theological standpoints are said to have been eccentric. Through his career in Yemen, he may have influenced the introduction of Zaidi doctrine and literature from the Caspian region.

== See also ==
- Al-Burhan: Abul-Fathh ad-Dailami's commentary book on Quran
- History of Yemen
- Imams of Yemen
- Rassids

Preceded by Abu Hashim al-Hasan	Zaydi Imam of Yemen; 1038–1053	Vacant Interregnum Title next held by al-Muhtasib al-Mujahid Hamzah
