= Al-Burhan =

Tafsir by Abu'l-Fath an-Nasir ad-Dailami

Tafsīr al Burhān
- Author: Abu'l-Fath an-Nasir ad-Dailami
- Original title: تفسير البرهان
- Language: Arabic
- Subject: Quranic exegesis
- Genre: Islamic literature
- Published: 11th century
- Media type: Manuscript

Tafsīr al Burhān is an exegesis on the Quran written by the Zaydi Imam Abu'l-Fath an-Nasir ad-Dailami in the 11th century. The book is still in existence in manuscript.
