= Yahya ibn Ali ibn Hammud al-Mu'tali =

Ruler of Córdoba (r. 1021–1023) (1025–1026) and Ruler of Málaga (1026–1035)

Yahya ibn Ali al-Mu'tali يحي بن علي المعتلي
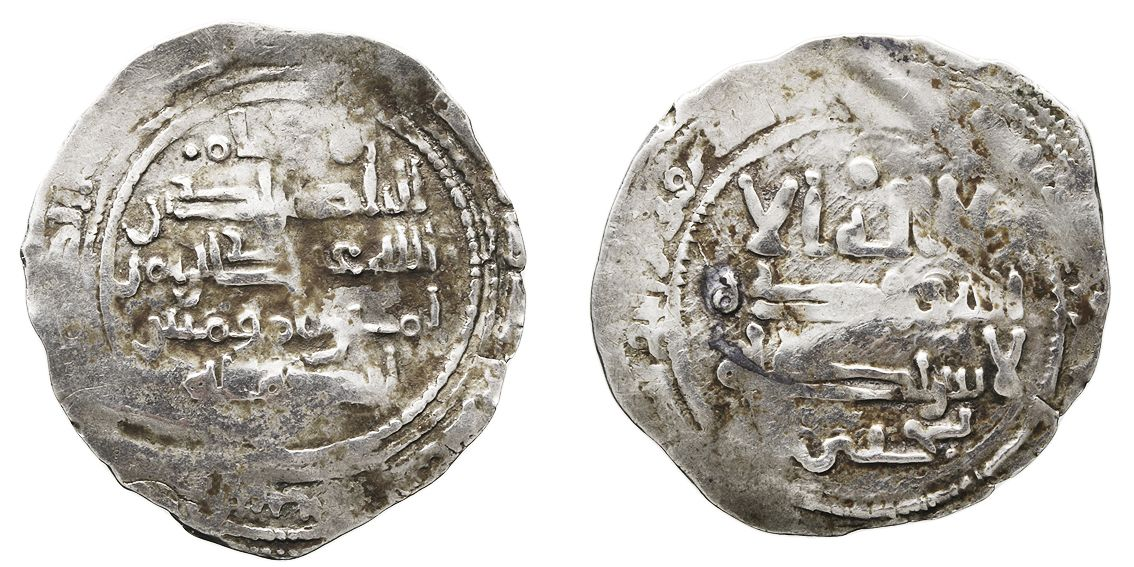
- Dirham coined under the reign of Yahya

8th Caliph of Córdoba (first period)
- Reign: 1021 – 1023
- Predecessor: Al-Qasim al-Ma'mun
- Successor: Al-Qasim al-Ma'mun

(second period)
- Reign: 1025 – 1026
- Predecessor: Muhammad III
- Successor: Hisham III

1st Ruler of Taifa of Málaga
- Reign: 1026 – 1036
- Predecessor: Position established
- Successor: Idris I al-Muta'ayyad
- Died: 1036
- Issue: Hasan al-Mustansir; Idris II al-Ali
Names
- Yaḥyā ibn ʿAlī al-Muʿtalī يحي بن علي المعتلي
- Dynasty: Hammudid
- Father: Ali al-Nasir

Yaḥyā ibn ʿAlī ibn Ḥammūd al-Muʿtalī (Arabic: يحي بن علي ين حمّود المعتلي; died 1036) was a Caliph of Cordoba of the Hammudid dynasty, and later founded the Taifa of Malaga, which he ruled until his death. As caliph, he reigned from 1021 to 1023 and again from 1025 to 1026.

== Biography ==
Son of Ali ibn Hammud, Yahya took his father's position as governor of Ceuta after the former captured Córdoba from caliph Sulayman and was proclaimed caliph al-Nasir. After his father was assassinated in 1018, his uncle al-Qasim claimed the throne. Yahya refused to recognize this succession and in 1021, marched on Córdoba with his Berber supporters. Al-Qasim fled to Seville as Yahya took the city and was proclaimed caliph al-Mu'tali on 13 August 1021.

Yahya's reign alienated his supporters soon, and fearing an overthrow, he went back to his stronghold of Málaga in February 1023. Al-Qasim took this opportunity to return and take the city. The Córdobans had grown tired of turbulent and chaotic Hammudid rule, and revolted after just six months. Al-Qasim fled and hid in Jerez, but was found by Yahya and brought to Málaga. He was imprisoned and ultimately assassinated.

In Córdoba, the populace chose a great-grandson of Abd al-Rahman III, Abd al-Rahman V as caliph. His reign was also short-lived as a mob attacked the palace and executed him, installing another cousin Muhammad III in his stead. Muhammad III was a highly inept ruler, and by 1025, rumors began spreading of his impeding overthrow. Upon learning this, Muhammad III fled to Zaragoza disguised as a singer, and was possibly killed during this escape.

Left without a ruler, the Córdoban aristocracy managed the city for six months before appealing to Yahya to come to the city and assume control again. Upon arriving on 9 November 1025, Yahya found a city with an empty treasury and no functioning government. Finding little interest in ruling from the once mighty capital, Yahya put his vizier Abu Ja'far ibn Musa in-charge before returning to Málaga.

Upon finding out the pro-Berber Hammudids had taken the city again, the rival saqaliba marched on the city, removed the Hammudid forces and departed, finding little interest in taking it for themselves. The aristocracy, once again left without a ruler to swear allegiance to, put the Umayyad Hisham III on the throne in June 1027.

Ruling from Málaga, Yahya continued using the title of caliph, which henceforth was also claimed by his successors. With support from Zirids of Granada, he took the kura of Algeciras as well, and declared the independent taifa of Málaga. His rule, which lasted till his death in 1036, was characterized by heavy conflict with the Abbadid taifa of Seville. After his death, he was succeeded by his brother Idris I al-Muta'ayyad. Two of Yahya's sons, Hasan al-Mustansir and Idris II al-Ali also reigned over Málaga in later decades.

== Bibliography ==
- Bosworth, C. E. (1996). The New Islamic Dynasties: A Chronological and Genealogical Manual. New York: Columbia University Press. ISBN 978-0-231-10714-3.
- Altamira, Rafael (1999). "Il califfato occidentale". Storia del mondo medievale. Vol. II.
- Arbuthnot, F. F. (1890). Arabic Authors: A Manual of Arabian History and Literature. London: W. Heinemann.
- Elliott, William (1975). The Attempt of a New Damascus: Córdoba Under the Caliphate (Master of Arts thesis). Creighton University.
- Flood, Timothy M. (2018-11-09). Rulers and Realms in Medieval Iberia, 711-1492. McFarland. ISBN 978-1-4766-3372-5.

Preceded by al-Qasim al-Ma'mun	Caliph of Córdoba; 1021–1023	Succeeded by al-Qasim al-Ma'mun
Preceded by Muhammad III	Caliph of Córdoba; 1025–1026	Succeeded by Hisham III
Preceded by New title	King of Málaga; 1026–1035	Succeeded by Idris I al-Muta'ayyad
