= Hammudid dynasty =

Arab Idrisid descent dynasty

The Hammudid dynasty (Arabic: بنو حمود, romanized: Banū Ḥammūd) was an Arab Muslim dynasty that briefly ruled the Caliphate of Córdoba and later the taifas of Málaga, Algeciras and Ceuta.

== History ==
=== Background ===
The Hammudid trace their descent from Idris ibn Abdallah, founder of the Idrisid dynasty and great-grandson of Hasan ibn Ali, maternal grandson of Muhammad. During the Andalusian civil war, when caliph Sulayman captured Córdoba in 1013 from Hisham II, he rewarded the Berber chieftains who had supported him with land in southern Al-Andalus. Two Hammudid brothers, Ali ibn Hammud and al-Qasim ibn Hammud, were given the governorship of Algeciras, Ceuta and Tangier. As Sulayman's power base collapsed, the brothers began their own plan to take power, believing that their lineage would distinct them from other local lords.

=== Reign as caliphs ===
Claiming to act on behalf of Hisham II, Ali marched upon Córdoba in 1016 and defeated Sulayman. Sulayman was charged with murdering the former caliph and was executed, while Ali took power as caliph al-Nasir on 3 July 1016. Ali's reign was despised by the Córdobans, and many of the lords who had supported him in his overthrow of Sulayman were disappointed when Hisham II was declared dead and Ali himself took power. Wishing to see a legitimate Umayyad on the throne, they proclaimed cousin of Sulayman, Abd al-Rahman IV caliph. Before Ali could deal with this rebellion, he was assassinated on 22 March 1018.

Ali's brother al-Qasim took power as caliph al-Ma'mun, though his rule was contested by Abd al-Rahman IV and his nephew Yahya ibn Ali. While Abd al-Rahman was soon killed in a failed attempt to capture Córdoba, Yahya continued denouncing his uncle and finally marched on Córdoba in August 1021. Al-Qasim fled the city, and Yahya was proclaimed caliph al-Mu'tali. His reign soon alienated his partisans, and fearing a coup, he went back to his stronghold of Málaga. Al-Qasim took this opportunity to retake the city, but was driven out by the hostile population who have had enough of Hammudid rule. He hid in Jerez, but was found and taken as a prisoner to Málaga by Yahya, and eventually assassinated in 1036.

After Hammudid removal, the Córdoban elites chose a set of inapt Umayyad princes as their caliphs, before appealing to Yahya to return and assume control. Upon arriving on 9 November 1025, Yahya found a city with an empty treasury and no functioning government. Finding little interest in ruling from the once mighty capital, Yahya put his vizier Abu Ja'far ibn Musa in-charge before returning to Málaga The anti-Berber saqaliba, upon hearing this, attacked the city and removed Hammudid forces before departing.

=== Rule over Málaga ===
After losing Córdoba, Yahya continued claiming the title of caliph from Málaga. After conquering Algeciras with assistance from Zirids of Granada, he declared the independent taifa of Málaga. After his death in 1036, he was succeeded by his brother Idris I al-Muta'ayyad. The Hammudid taifa contested heavily against Abbadid taifa of Seville, reaching its climax in a victory in the 1039 Battle of Écija. After Idris's death, the kingdom was divided between his son Yahya II al-Qa'im, who received Malaga, and Muhammad ibn al-Qasim al-Ma'mun, who gained control of Algeciras. Yahya II lasted only one year and was ousted in 1040 by his cousin Hasan al-Mustansir, who in turn was overthrown in 1042 by the saqaliba general Naya al-Siqlabi. In the same year Naya was assassinated, and the Hammudids regained the throne with Hassan's brother Idris II al-Ali. For the next decade, different members of the family kept fighting, and in 1056, Málaga was conquered by its once allies Zirids, while Algericas fell to the rival Abbadids in 1058.

== List of rulers ==
=== Caliphs of Córdoba ===
1. Ali al-Nasir, descendant of Idris I, 1016–1018
2. Al-Qasim al-Ma'mun, brother of Ali, 1018–1021, 1023
3. Yahya al-Mu'tali, son of Ali, 1021–1023, 1025–1026

=== Rulers of Málaga, Algeciras and Ceuta ===
1. Yahya I al-Mu'tali, son of Ali, 1026–1036
2. Idris I al-Muta'ayyad, son of Ali, 1036–1039

=== Rulers of Málaga only ===
1. Yahya II al-Qa'im, son of Idris I, 1039–1040
2. Hasan al-Mustansir, son of Yahya I, 1040–1043
3. Idris II al-Ali, son of Yahya I, 1043–1046, 1053–1056
4. Muhammad I al-Mahdi, son of Idris I, 1046–1052
5. Idris III al-Muwaffaq, son of Yahya II, 1052–1053
6. Muhammad II al-Musta'li, son of Idris I, 1053–1056

=== Rulers of Algeciras only ===
1. Muhammad, son of al-Qasim, 1039–1048
2. al-Qasim al-Wathiq, son of Muhammad, 1048–1058

== Bibliography ==
- Amabe, Fukuzo (18 April 2016). Urban Autonomy in Medieval Islam: Damascus, Aleppo, Córdoba, Toledo, Valencia and Tunis. Leiden: Brill. ISBN 978-90-04-31598-3.
- Bosworth, Clifford Edmund (2004). The New Islamic Dynasties: A Chronological and Genealogical Manual. Edinburgh University Press. pp. 14–16. ISBN 9780748621378. "..or were Berberised Arabs like the Hammudids..."
- Collins, Roger (2012). Caliphs and Kings: Spain 796-1031. Wiley-Blackwell. ISBN 9781118273999.
- Elliott, William (1975). The Attempt of a New Damascus: Córdoba Under the Caliphate (Master of Arts thesis). Creighton University.
- Flood, Timothy M. (2018). Rulers and Realms in Medieval Iberia, 711-1492. McFarland. ISBN 978-1-4766-3372-5.
- Lane-Poole, Stanley (1894). The Mohammadan Dynasties: Chronological and Genealogical Tables with Historicals Introductions. Constable. pp. 23–25. ISBN 9781402166662.
- Scales, Peter (1994). The Fall of the Caliphate of Cordoba: Berbers and Andalusis in Conflict. Vol. II. BRILL. pp. 38–109 & 142–182. ISBN 9789004098688.
- Viguera-Molins, María (2010). "Al-Andalus and the Maghrib (from the fifth/eleventh century to the fall of the Almoravids)". In Fierro, Maribel (ed.). The New Cambridge History of Islam, Volume 2: The Western Islamic World, Eleventh to Eighteenth Centuries. Cambridge: Cambridge University Press. pp. 19–47. ISBN 978-0-521-83957-0. "To this list we might add the enclave of the Berberised Arab Hammudids..."

— Royal house — Hammudid dynasty
Preceded by Umayyad dynasty	Caliphs of Córdoba; 1016–1023; 1025–1027	Succeeded by Umayyad dynasty (Restored)
New title	Taifa kings of Málaga; 1026–1057	Annexed to the Taifa of Granada
New title	Taifa kings of Ceuta; 1009–1055	Succeeded by Barghawāṭa
New title	Taifa kings of Algeciras; 1039–1058	Annexed to the Taifa of Seville
