= Al-Mu'id li-Din Allah =

Imam of the Zaidi state in Yemen from 1027 to 1030

Al-Muʽid li-Din Illah (المعيد لدين الله, died 1030) was an imam of the Zaidi state in Yemen who reigned in the period 1027–1030.

After 1002, the Zaidi imamate in highland Yemen was contested between various claimants. A Caspian Zaidi leader in Persia, Abu Talib Yahya, is sometimes formally counted as imam in the period 1020–1033 in Zaydiyyah historiography. Meanwhile, the brother of the old imam al-Mahdi al-Husayn, Ja'far, ruled the Zaidi centre Sa'dah as emir for periods. In 1027 a new pretender of obscure origins appeared and claimed the imamate. He proclaimed himself under the title al-Mu'id li-Din Illah (he who brings people back to God). He actually managed to establish his authority in the important city San'a. Nevertheless, he was killed by opponents already in 1030.

== See also ==
- Imams of Yemen
- Rassids

Preceded by Abu Talib Yahya	Zaydi Imam of Yemen; 1027-1030	Succeeded by Abu Hashim al-Hasan
