= Al-Mu'ayyad Ahmad =

Zaydi Imam in Yemen (944–1020)

Al-Mu'ayyad Ahmad Amuli (944–1020) was an imam of the Zaydiyyah sect.

Al-Mu'ayyad Ahmad's ancestor in the tenth degree was the Shi'a imam Hasan bin Ali. He was a disciple of Abu Abdallah al-Basri and the Qadi Abd al-Jabbar, and a learned expert on the Ahl al-Bayt concept. Al-Mu'ayyad Ahmad was accepted as imam in Gilan and Deylaman in Persia, and had connections with the Zaidi area of Yemen. After 1013, no local imam was appointed for many years in the Yemeni highland. In Zaidi historiography, al-Mu'ayyad Ahmad is sometimes listed as such, although he never visited Yemen. He died in Langa in Deylaman in 1020, being succeeded by his brother Abu Talib Yahya.

== See also ==
- Imams of Yemen

Preceded by al-Mahdi al-Husayn	Zaydi Imam of Yemen during interregnum in Yemen; 1013–1020	Succeeded by Abu Talib Yahya
