= Abu Hashim al-Hasan =

Imam of the Zaidi state in Yemen (died 1040)

Abu Hashim al-Hasan (died 1040) was an imam of the Zaidi state in Yemen who ruled part of the Yemeni highlands between 1031 and 1040.

Abu Hashim al-Hasan was a fifth-generation descendant of al-Qasim al-Rassi (d. 860), one of the founders of the theological traditions of the Zaydi branch of Shi'a Islam. In 1031, the year after the violent death of the former imam al-Mu’id li-Din Illah, Abu Hashim claimed the imamate. He was able to seize San'a. One of the local grandees, Ibn Abi Hashid, fled, while another one, Nunsur bin Abi'l-Futuh, submitted.

Abu Hashim's authority in San'a lasted until 1037, when he was expelled by the tribesmen of Hamdan. The Hamdanites later invited Ja'far, brother of the old imam al-Mahdi al-Husayn, to rule the city as emir. The following years were filled with contests over San'a, and Abu Hashim was able to regain control over the commercially important city for a brief term. After he had lost the city for good, he withdrew to Sa'dah in the north, which was the old stronghold of the Zaydiyyah. The hard pressed Abu Hashim died in 1040.

A new pretender, Abu'l-Fath an-Nasir ad-Dailami, arrived from Persia, possibly before Abu Hashim's death. Having proclaimed his da'wa (call for the imamate), he proceeded to seize Sa'dah and San'a some years later, in 1046.

== See also ==
- Imams of Yemen
- Rassids

Preceded by al-Mu'id li-Din Allah	Zaydi Imam of Yemen; 1031-1040	Succeeded by Abu'l-Fath an-Nasir ad-Dailami
