= Abd al-Rahman V =

Ruler of Córdoba (r. 1023–1024)

Abd ar-Rahman V عبدالرحمٰن الخامس

9th Caliph of Córdoba
- Reign: 1023–1024
- Predecessor: al-Qasim al-Ma'mun
- Successor: Muhammad III
- Born: 1001
- Died: 1024 (aged 22–23); Córdoba
- Dynasty: Umayyad (Marwanid)
- Father: Hisham bin Abd al-Jabbar bin Abd ar-Rahman III
- Mother: Ghaia

Abd ar-Rahman V (Arabic: عبد الرحمن بن هشام المستظهر بالله, romanized: ʿAbd ar-Raḥmān ibn Hishām al-Mustaẓhir bi-llāh; 1001–1024) was the 9th Caliph of the Caliphate of Córdoba.

== Background ==
In 1009, Civil war broke out in the Caliphate of Córdoba. In 1016, Ali ibn Hammud al-Nasir took control of the Caliphate away from the Umayyads and became the first member of the Hammud family to rule the Caliphate. Ali ibn Hammud ruled for less than two years and was succeeded by his brother Al-Qasim al-Ma'mun. Al-Qasim was a good leader and was gaining in popularity during his reign, however, he was deposed after approximately three and a half years by his nephew, Yahya ibn Ali ibn Hammud. Yahya's vanity and arrogance was quickly apparent to the citizens of Córdoba and after one and a half years he was forced to flee. At that time, al-Qasim returned to the capital and reclaimed the throne. Within six months, however, the citizens of Córdoba expressed their displeasure with the turmoil of the Hammudids by means of insurrection and riots forcing Al-Qasim to flee a second time.

After the departure of al-Qasim, the citizens of Córdoba resolved to return leadership of the Caliphate back to the Umayyads. With that intention in mind, the populace convened a convocation on 2 December 1023 and expressed their desire to be led by one of the descendants of the first caliph of the Caliphate, Abd al-Rahman III. Quickly Abd al-Rahman ibn Hisham ibn Abd-al-Jabbar was selected and proclaimed new caliph Abd al-Rahman V.

== Reign ==
Abd al-Rahman was a very young man when he was installed as caliph. And although he surrounded himself with competent functionaries, the young caliph was unable to return the Caliphate to the strength, unity, and power of the former Umayyad state. Due to a lack of treasury, it was necessary for Abd al-Rahman to immediately take money from the middle and lower citizenry. Due to a lack of a loyal military, Abd al-Rahman resorted to hiring a Berber militia. Such actions quite quickly in a period of less than two months resulted in a mob of unemployed workmen attacking the palace and enlisting another Umayyad prince, Muhammad III of Córdoba, as the new caliph. The new caliph was then implored as one of his first official acts to send Abd al-Rahman to his death.

== Citations ==
Abd al-Rahman V Caliphate of Córdoba Cadet branch of the Umayyad dynasty Died: 1024
Preceded by al-Qasim al-Ma'mun	Caliph of Córdoba; 1023–1024	Succeeded by Muhammad III
