= Ali ibn Hammud al-Nasir =

Ruler of Córdoba (r. 1016–1018)

Ali ibn Hammud al-Nasir علي بن حمود الناصر

6th Caliph of Córdoba
- Reign: 1016 — 22 March 1018
- Predecessor: Sulayman ibn al-Hakam
- Successor: Al-Qasim al-Ma'mun; Abd al-Rahman IV
- Born: c. 966
- Died: 22 March 1018 (aged 52)
- Issue: Yahya al-Mu'tali
Names
- ʿAlī ibn Ḥammūd al-Nāṣir (علي بن حمود الناصر)
- Dynasty: Hammudid

ʿAlī ibn Ḥammūd al-Nāṣir (Arabic: علي بن حمود الناصر, c. 966 – 22 March 1018) was the sixth Caliph of Córdoba and first from the Hammudid dynasty. He ruled from 1016 until his assassination two years later.

== Biography ==
=== Background ===
Ali ibn Hammud claimed descent from Idris ibn Abdallah, the founder of Idrisid dynasty. After the largely figurehead caliph Hisham II was usurped by his cousin Muhammad II, the Caliphate of Córdoba fell into a civil war. For the next few years, power was contested between Hisham II, Muhammad II and Sulayman, another great-grandson of Abd al-Rahman III. By 1013, Sulayman captured Córdoba with the help of his Berber army after a two-and-half-year siege. Hisham II, the caliph in Córdoba, disappeared with many individuals believing that he was murdered.

Although he had offered general amnesty, Sulayman's Berber army began a campaign of revenge killings and destruction against their political enemies. In an attempt to lessen the violence, placate the Berbers, and assert his claim to the caliphate, Sulayman gave territories in southern al-Andalus and north Africa to his Berber generals. As a part of this program, Sulayman gave Ceuta to Ali ibn Hammud and Tangier, Arcila, and Algeciras to his brother al-Qasim ibn Hammud.

=== Rise to power ===
In Córdoba, the Mawali and Arabs continued being hostile toward Sulayman and his Berber troops. As his power base collapsed, his Berber lords started becoming more independent from the central authority. Ali ibn Hammud at first postured himself as being loyal to Sulayman, waiting for the most opportune time to act and take power. By in late 1013, he declared himself independent of Sulayman and announced that he would undertake to free the legitimate caliph Hisham II, who’s ultimate fate remained a mystery.

He also promoted a narrative that Hisham II, uncertain about his own fate during the siege of Córdoba, had named Ali ibn Hammud as his heir-presumptive. The narrative also purportedly claimed that Hisham II sought to have his death avenged by Ali ibn Hammud. In 1014, when Mujahid al-Amiri, ruler of the Balearic Islands, began his expeditions in the Mediterranean, Ali crossed the Straits of Gibraltar and captured the city of Málaga, using it as a base of operations in al-Andalus. Over the next 18 months, he and his brother consolidated their forces in part by joining with al-Qasim. The brothers believed that their lineage would stand them apart from the local lords.

The Berber rulers of southern al-Andalus were more interested in their respective domains then they were in defending Sulayman and offered the brothers little resistance. In the summer of 1016, Ali marched on Córdoba and on 17 June, defeated Sulayman’s Berber troops holding the city. The palace was immediately searched for Hisham II, and ultimately an exhumed body was declared to be his. Sulayman was charged with the murder of the caliph and beheaded. On 3 July 1016, Ali was proclaimed caliph al-Nasir.

=== Reign and death ===
To bring the citizens of Córdoba and the Berbers together into a coalition, Ali ibn Hammud attempted to reduce the abuses that were being committed by the Berber militia against the citizens. His efforts, were unsuccessful and over time the hatred of the Córdobans for his regime became evident who considered him pro-Berber. After approximately eight months, Ali reversed course by actually favoring Berbers and allowing them to once again abuse the Córdobans by means of arrests, property confiscation, and arms seizures. As these abuses continued, he gained a reputation as “a scourge of the Córdobans.”

Opposition to Ali's rule also arose among many of those who had supported him in his usurpation of Sulayman. One such individual, Khayran al-Amiri, the ruler of Almería, had supported Ali largely to eliminate Sulayman. Khayran and others desired to see a legitimate Umayyad as caliph and had actually hoped that they would find Hisham II alive when Córdoba was taken. By early 1018, these Umayyad supporters had selected Abd al-Rahman IV as their candidate for caliph and open rebellion had broken out. Shortly thereafter, as Ali ibn Hammud prepared to deal with this rebellion, he was attacked in the palace baths and killed by three of his household servants on 22 March 1018. He was succeeded by his brother, al-Qasim al-Ma'mun.

== Bibliography ==
- Altamira, Rafael (1999). "Il califfato occidentale". Storia del mondo medievale. Vol. II. pp. 477–515.
- Amabe, Fukuzo (18 April 2016). Urban Autonomy in Medieval Islam: Damascus, Aleppo, Córdoba, Toledo, Valencia and Tunis. Leiden: Brill. ISBN 978-90-04-31598-3.
- Chejne, Anwar G. (1974). Muslim Spain: Its History and Culture. Minneapolis: The University of Minnesota Press. ISBN 0816606889.
- Clarke, Nicola (2 January 2016). "Heirs and Spares: Elite Fathers and Their Sons in the Literary Sources of Umayyad Iberia". Al-Masāq. 28 (1): 67–83. doi:10.1080/09503110.2016.1152805. S2CID 146870151.
- Flood, Timothy M. (2018-11-09). Rulers and Realms in Medieval Iberia, 711-1492. McFarland. ISBN 978-1-4766-3372-5.
- Fletcher, Richard A. (1993). Moorish Spain. Berkeley: University of California Press.
- Kennedy, Hugh (2014). Muslim Spain and Portugal, A Political History of al-Andalud. Abingdon, Oxon: Routledge. ISBN 978-0-582-49515-9.
- Scales, Peter (1994). The Fall of the Caliphate of Córdoba: Berbers and Andalusis in Conflict. Leiden: Brill. ISBN 978-90-04-61082-8.

Preceded by Sulayman ibn al-Hakam	Caliph of Córdoba; 1016–1018	Succeeded by al-Qasim al-Ma'mun
