= Ad-Da'i Yusuf =

Yemeni Zaidi imam (died 1012)

Ad-Da'i Yusuf (died September 12, 1012) was an imam of the Zaidi state in Yemen who ruled for two highly turbulent terms (977–999, 1002–1012).

== Struggles against Yu'firids and Ziyadids ==
Yusuf bin Yahya was a son of the imam al-Mansur Yahya who died in 976. In the following year, Yusuf was proclaimed with the regnal name ad-Da'i Yusuf. His early years were filled with struggles against the Yu'firid Dynasty that ruled much of the Yemeni highland. The important city San'a at this time was subjected to the overlordship of the Sunni Ziyadid dynasty which ruled the Tihamah from its base in Zabid. Ad-Da'i Yusuf managed to gain recognition as prince in San'a and the surrounding province in 978, reciting the khutbah in his own name. Nevertheless, the Ziyadid governor Ibn ad-Dahhak soon fought back. The last effective Yu'firid ruler Abdallah managed to win back the city and increase his power by invading the Ziyadid domains and seizing Zabid. After Abdallah's death in 997, Yu'firid rule collapsed.

== Contested leadership ==
For ad-Da'i Yusuf, this was but a brief respite. A rival for the imamate, al-Mansur al-Qasim al-Iyyani appeared in 999. With the assistance of the Hamdan tribesmen, ad-Da'i Yusuf was expelled from Sa'dah, the traditional seat of the imams. A Zaidi Sharif, al-Qasim bin al-Husayn, was dispatched to San'a by the new imam, and the Zaydiyyah communities submitted to him. After some years, al-Qasim bin al-Husayn changed his allegiance to ad-Da'i Yusuf again. Al-Mansur al-Qasim al-Iyyani retired from power in 1002, and ad-Da'i Yusuf ruled for a second term. However, his time was filled with petty fighting over San'a, where the tribesmen of Hamdan and Khawlan played a major role. He also had to fight al-Mansur's son who posed as imam under the name al-Mahdi al-Husayn. This uneasy situation persisted until the death of ad-Da'i Yusuf in 1012, after an extremely turbulent reign.

== See also ==
- Imams of Yemen
- Rassids

Preceded by al-Mansur Yahya	Zaydi Imam of Yemen; 977–999	Succeeded by al-Mansur al-Qasim al-Iyyani
Preceded by al-Mansur al-Qasim al-Iyyani	Zaydi Imam of Yemen contested by al-Mahdi al-Husayn; 1002–1012	Succeeded by al-Mahdi al-Husayn
