= Al-Qasim al-Ma'mun =

Ruler of Córdoba (r. 1018–1021, 1023)

al-Qasim al-Ma'mun القاسم المأمون

7th Caliph of Córdoba (first period)
- Reign: 28 March 1018 – August 1021 (~3 years)
- Predecessor: Ali al-Nasir
- Successor: Yahya al-Mu'tali

(second period)
- Reign: 6 February 1023 – August 1023 (~6 months)
- Predecessor: Yahya al-Mu'tali
- Successor: Abd al-Rahman V
- Died: 1036
Names
- al-Qāsim al-Maʾmūn ibn Ḥammūd القاسم المأمون بن حمود
- Dynasty: Hammudid

Al-Qāsim al-Maʾmūn ibn Ḥammūd (Arabic: القاسم المأمون بن حمّود, died 1036) was the seventh caliph of Córdoba from 1018 to 1021, and again briefly in 1023. He was the second caliph from the short lived Hammudid dynasty.

== Biography ==
The Hammudids claimed descent from Idris ibn Abdallah, the founder of Idrisid dynasty. During the Andalusian civil war, caliph Sulayman captured Córdoba with his Berber army in 1013. As a reward, he gave the Berber leaders territories in southern al-Andalus and north Africa. Al-Qasim received Tangier, Arcila, and Algeciras while his brother Ali was given Ceuta.

Sulayman's reign was fragile, and the Hammudid brothers began their own plan to take power. In summer of 1016, they marched on Córdoba, and defeated and executed Sulayman. Ali ibn Hammud was subsequently proclaimed caliph al-Nasir. The Umayyad sympathizers kept plotting against this usurpation of power, and a revolt broke out in the name of a great-grandson of Abd al-Rahman III, Abd al-Rahman IV. Shortly thereafter, al-Nasir was assassinated and al-Qasim claimed the throne as caliph al-Ma'mun on 28 March 1018. Abd al-Rahman IV meanwhile was killed in an attempt to capture Córdoba.

Ali's succession was disputed by his son, Yahya, who gathered his supporters and marched on Córdoba in August 1021. Al-Qasim abandoned the city and fled to Seville. Yahya entered Córdoba as caliph al-Mu'tali on 13 August. His rule alienated his supporters and fearing an overthrow, he fled in February 1023. Al-Qasim took this opportunity to return and take the city. The Córdobans however had enough of Hammudid rule and six months later riots forced him to flee again. He took refuge in Jerez, but was found and imprisoned by Yahya, who ultimately had him assassinated in 1036.

== Bibliography ==
- Dozy, Reinhart Pieter Anne (1861). Histoire des musulmans d'Espagne: jusqu'à la conquête de l'Andalousie par les Almoravides (711 - 1110) (in French). Brill. pp. 332–333.
- Flood, Timothy M. (2018-11-09). Rulers and Realms in Medieval Iberia, 711-1492. McFarland. pp. 66–67. ISBN 978-1-4766-3372-5.

Guichard, Pierre (2000). L'Espagne et la Sicile musulmanes aux XIe et XIIe siècles (in French). Presses Universitaires Lyon. p. 229. ISBN 978-2-7297-0658-6.

Preceded by Ali ibn Hammud	Caliph of Córdoba; 1018–1021	Succeeded by Yahia ibn Ali
Preceded by Yahia ibn Ali	Caliph of Córdoba; 1023	Succeeded by Abd ar-Rahman V
