= Umayyad state of Córdoba =

State in Islamic Iberia (756–1031 CE)

Coordinates: 37.88°N 4.78°W

Emirate of Córdoba إِمَارَةُ قُرطُبَة (Arabic) (756–929) Caliphate of Córdoba خِلَافَةُ قُرطُبَة (Arabic) (929–1031)
- 756–1031
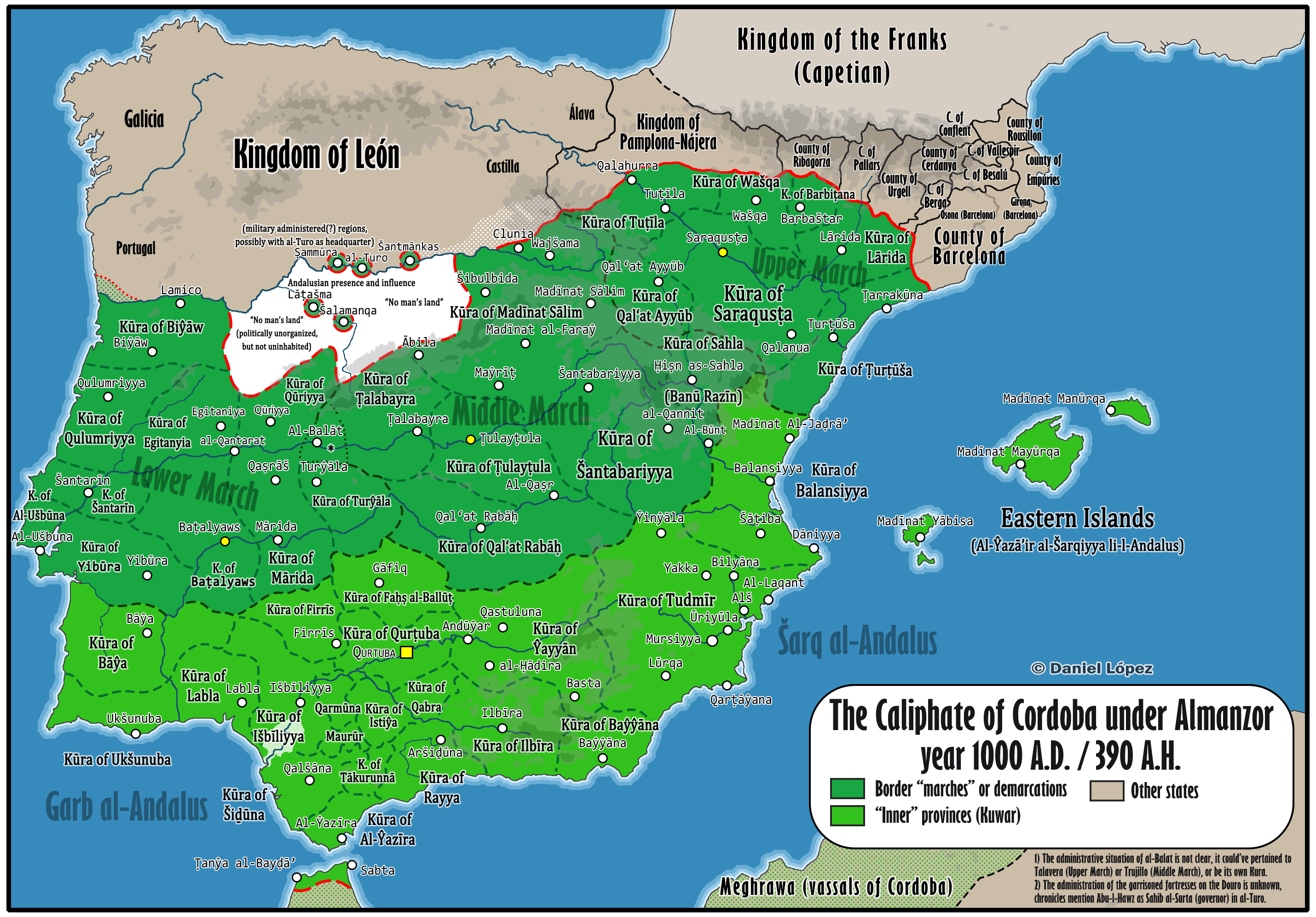
- The Caliphate circa 1000 CE
- Capital: Córdoba
- Official languages: Arabic
- Common languages: Andalusi Arabic; Andalusi Romance; Berber languages; Hebrew
- Religion: Islam (official)
- Government: Hereditary monarchy
- Emir (756–929)
  - 756–788: Abd al-Rahman I (first)
  - 912–929: Abd al-Rahman III (last)
- Caliph (929–1031)
  - 929–961: Abd al-Rahman III (first)
  - 1026–1031: Hisham III (last)
- History
  - Abd al-Rahman I proclaimed emir in Córdoba: 756
  - Abd al-Rahman III proclaims himself caliph: 929
  - Disintegrated into independent taifa kingdoms: 1031

Area
- 1000 est.: 600,000 km^{2} (230,000 sq mi)

Population
  - 1000 est.: 10,000,000
- Currency: Dirham
Preceded by
Fihrids
Idrisid dynasty
Banu Isam
Succeeded by
Taifa kingdoms
- Today part of: Gibraltar (UK); Morocco; Portugal; Spain

The Emirate of Córdoba, and from 929, the Caliphate of Córdoba, was an Arab Islamic state ruled by the Umayyad dynasty from 756 to 1031. Its territory comprised most of the Iberian Peninsula (known to Muslims as al-Andalus), the Balearic Islands, and parts of North Africa, with its capital in Córdoba (at the time Qurṭubah). From 756 it was ruled as an independent emirate until Abd al-Rahman III proclaimed himself as caliph in 929.

The state was founded by Abd al-Rahman I, an Umayyad prince who fled the defeat and persecution of the Umayyad clan in Syria following the Abbasid revolution. The polity flourished for nearly three centuries, before disintegrating in the early 11th century during the Fitna of al-Andalus, a civil war between the descendants of caliph Hisham II and the successors of his hajib (court official), Almanzor. In 1031, after years of infighting, the caliphate collapsed and fractured into a number of independent Muslim taifa (kingdoms).

The period was characterized by an expansion of trade and culture, including the construction of well-known pieces of Andalusi architecture, most notably the Great Mosque of Córdoba and the palatine city of Madinat al-Zahra.

== Political history ==
=== Background ===
The Visigothic Kingdom had ruled Iberia for over two centuries when it was conquered by the Umayyad Caliphate. The Umayyads had previously conducted small raids on the southern tip of Iberia against the Visigoths, but full-scale conquest did not begin until April 711. An army led by Tariq ibn Ziyad crossed into Southern Hispania from North Africa across the Strait of Gibraltar. After the crossing, Tariq's troops defeated Visigothic forces at the Battle of Guadalete. Roderic, the last king of the Visigoths, was killed, leaving an open path into Hispania. The Umayyads established the Iberian Peninsula as a province (wilāya) of their empire. The rulers of this province established their capital in Córdoba and received the administrative titles wāli or emīr.

=== Emirate ===
In 756, Abd al-Rahman I, a prince of the deposed Umayyad royal family, refused to recognize the authority of the Abbasid Caliphate and became an independent emir of Córdoba. He had been on the run for six years after the Umayyads had lost the position of caliph in Damascus in 750 to the Abbasids. Intent on regaining a position of power, he defeated the existing Muslim rulers of the area who had defied Umayyad and Abbasid rule. Abd al-Rahman I united various local fiefdoms into an independent emirate. The campaigns to unify al-Andalus went into Toledo, Zaragoza, Pamplona, and Barcelona and took over twenty-five years to complete.

Despite the realm's independence from Baghdad, the emirate's rulers used the titles of emir or sultan until the mid-10th century and nominally recognized the suzerainty and legitimacy of the Abbasid Caliphs in Baghdad.

For the next century and a half, his descendants continued to rule as the emirs of Córdoba, with nominal control over the rest of al-Andalus and sometimes parts of western Maghreb. Real control was always in question, particularly over the marches along the Christian border, where power depended on the competence of the individual emir. For example, the power of emir Abdullah ibn Muhammad al-Umawi (c. 900) did not extend beyond Córdoba itself.

Raids increased the emirate's territory, such as one to Corsica in 806. In 818, the inhabitants of the al-Rabad suburb of Córdoba rose against Al-Hakam I. After the revolt's suppression, the inhabitants were expelled. Some settled in Fez or Alexandria, while others formed the Emirate of Crete in the 820s.

The founder Abd al-Rahman I had used Berbers and the saqaliba for a permanent army of 40,000 to end the conflicts that had plagued the emirate. In the time of Emir Al-Hakam I, a palatine guard of 3,000 riders and 2,000 infantry was manned by Slavic slaves. Under Emir Muhammad I, the army reached 35,000 to 40,000 combatants, half of them Syrian military contingents.

An Umayyad expedition helmed by ʿIṣām al-Ḫawlānī conquered the Balearic Islands (the 'Eastern Islands') and incorporated them to Umayyad rule under emir Abdullah circa 902–903.

=== Caliphate ===
Abd al-Rahman III ascended to the throne in 912, and faced the Fatimid Caliphate, a rival North African Shiʿite Islamic empire based in Tunis. The Fatimid claim of caliph challenged the legitimacy of the Abbasids' religious authority. Abd al-Rahman III took the title of caliph in 929, challenging the Fatimids in their claim to religious authority. Internally, the Spanish Umayyads considered themselves as closer to Muhammad and more legitimate than the Abbasids, even though the Caliphate of Córdoba's legitimacy was not accepted outside of al-Andalus and its North African affiliates.

Fatimid invasions were thwarted when Abd al-Rahman III secured Melilla in 927, Ceuta in 931, and Tangier in 951. In 948, the Idrisid emir Abul-Aish Ahmad recognized the caliphate, but refused to allow them to occupy Tangier. The Umayyads besieged Tangier in 949 and defeated Abul-Aish, forcing him to retreat, and then occupied the rest of northern Morocco.

Abd al-Rahman III increased diplomatic relations with the Berber tribes in North Africa, Christian kingdoms from the north, West Francia, East Francia, and the Byzantine Empire. Abd al-Rahman III also brought the Christian kingdoms of the north under his direct influence through military force. The size of the Caliphal army under Abd al-Rahman III was between 30,000 and 50,000 troops.

The caliphate became very profitable during the reign of Abd al-Rahman III, with public revenue up to 6,245,000 dinars, higher than previous administrations. Wealth was budgeted into three parts: the payment of the salaries and maintenance of the army, the preservation of public buildings, and the needs of the caliph.

Abd al-Rahman III was succeeded by his 46-year-old son, Al-Hakam II, in 961. Al-Hakam II continued his father's policy toward Christian kings and North African rebels. Al-Hakam's relied on his advisers more than his father because the caliphate was less prosperous, and there was less money to go around. This style of rulership suited Al-Hakam II since he was more interested in his scholarly and intellectual pursuits than ruling the caliphate. The caliphate reached an intellectual and scholarly peak under Al-Hakam II.

Another Fatimid invasion of Morocco occurred in 958, led by the general, Jawhar, and Al-Hassan II had to recognise the Fatimids. The Umayyads sent their general, Ghalib, to invade Idrisid Morocco in 973. By 974, Al-Hassan II was taken to Córdoba, and the remaining Idrisids recognized Umayyad rule.

==== Reforms under Almanzor ====
The death of Al-Hakam II in 976 marked the beginning of the end of Caliphal power. Al-Hakam was succeeded by his only son, Hisham II. Al-Hakam's top advisor, Almanzor, pronounced the 10-year-old boy caliph and swore an oath of obedience to him.

Almanzor had great influence over Subh, the mother and regent of Hisham II. Almanzor isolated Hisham in Córdoba, eradicated opposition, and allowed Berbers from Africa to migrate to al-Andalus to increase his base of support. While Hisham II was caliph, he was merely a figurehead.

In 996, Almanzor sent an invasion force to Morocco. After three months of struggle, his forces retreated to Tangier. Almanzor then sent out a powerful reinforcement under his son Abd al-Malik, whose armies clashed near Tangier. The Umayyads entered Fes on 13 October 998 once the gates of the city were opened.

Almanzor continued the military reforms by Al-Hakam and his predecessors. He professionalized the regular army, which guaranteed his military power in the capital and ensured the availability of forces for numerous campaigns. Professionalization de-emphasized levies and other non-professional troops, which were replaced with taxes to support the professional troops (often saqaliba or Maghrebis) and freed Córdoban subjects from military service. Almanzor expanded recruitment of the saqaliba and Berbers. He also created new units, outside the regular army that were loyal to him and served to control the capital.

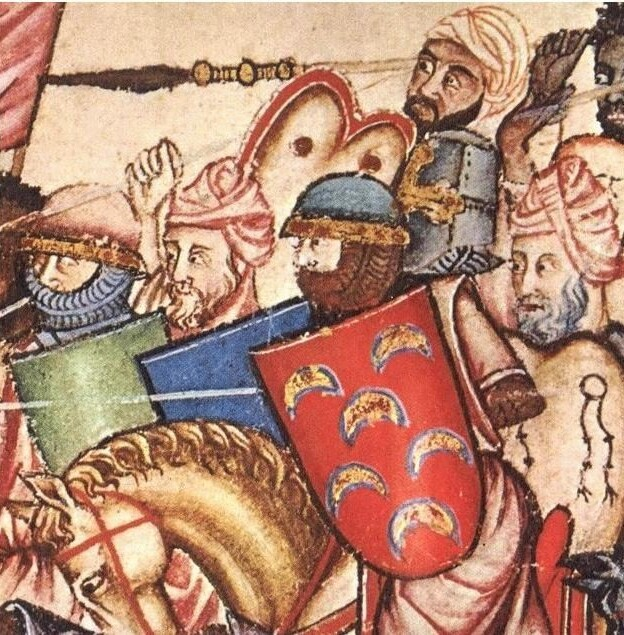
Almanzor's troops, as represented in the Cantigas de Santa Maria. The chamberlain carried out wide-ranging military reforms.

Almanzor abolished the system of tribal units with their own commanders. This system had been in decline due to a lack of Arab recruits and the pseudo-feudalistic institutions on the frontiers. A new system of mixed units without clear loyalty under orders from Administration officials replaced it.

The increase in military forces and their partial professionalization led to an increase in financial expenses, and incentivized campaigning so troops could be paid with loot and land. Lands handed over to the soldiers were subject to tribute and ceased to operate under a system of border colonization.

The nucleus of the new army was formed by Maghrebi Berber forces. Arabs, Berbers, and Slavs within the army were played off against one another by Almanzor to maintain his power and authority.

The massive incorporation of North African horsemen relegated the infantry to sieges and fortress garrisons. This reform led to entire tribes, particularly Berber riders, being moved to the peninsula.

At that time al-Andalus was known as Dar Jihad, or "country of jihad". It attracted many zealous volunteers, who made up a small but important portion of the total army. Almanzor's personal guard was made up of Christian mercenaries who also participated in his campaigns in Christian territories.

Contemporary figures on the size of the army are contradictory. Some accounts claim that their armies numbered two hundred thousand horsemen and six hundred thousand foot soldiers, while others talk about twelve thousand horsemen, three thousand mounted Berbers and two thousand sūdān, African light infantry. Christian chroniclers record that "ordinarily the Saracen armies amount to 30, 40, 50 or 60,000 men, even when in serious occasions they reach 100, 160, 300 and even 600,000 fighters" in the time of Almanzor. In the campaign that swept Astorga and León, chroniclers record Almanzor leading 12,000 African horsemen, five thousand al-Andalusi horsemen, and 40,000 infantry. Stories of Almanzor's last campaign record forty-six thousand horsemen, six hundred forces guarding the train, 26,000 infantry, two hundred scouts or "police", and one hundred and thirty drummers. The garrison of Córdoba was recorded at 10,500 horsemen, while other forces guarded the northern border in dispersed detachments.

Other modern studies found the army was between 50,000 and 90,000 under Almanzor. Scholars have argued Almanzor's armies could muster 600,000 laborers and 200,000 horses "drawn from all provinces of the empire". Évariste Lévi-Provençal argues the Almanzor's armies were between 35,000 and 70–75,000 soldiers. It is likely that the leader's armies may not have exceeded twenty thousand men. Until the eleventh century no Muslim army on campaign exceeded thirty thousand troops, while during the eighth century the trans-Pyrenean expeditions totaled ten thousand men and those carried out against Christians in the north of the peninsula were even smaller.

The main weapon of the peninsular campaigns, which required speed and surprise, was the light cavalry. To try to counteract them, the Castilians created the role of "villain knights" by ennobling those free men who were willing to keep a horse to increase the mounted units through the Fuero de Castrojeriz of 974. For similar reasons, the Barcelonan count Borrell II created the figure of the homes of paratge who obtained privileged military status by fighting against the Córdobans armed on horseback – after losing their capital in the fall of 985.

Military industry flourished in factories around Córdoba. The city was said to produce 1,000 bows and 20,000 arrows monthly, and 1,300 shields and 3,000 campaign stores annually.

In contrast to the role the navy played under Abd al-Rahman III, under Almanzor, it served as a means of transporting ground troops, such as between the Maghreb and the Iberian Peninsula. This was also seen with Alcácer do Sal's ships in the campaign against Santiago de Compostela in 997. As in the army Almanzor recruited Berbers faithful to him. In its administration he favored the saqalibas to the detriment of native officials. The fleet was reinforced with a network of ports and a new base in the Atlantic, in Alcácer do Sal, which protected the city of Coimbra, recovered in the 980s. It served as start of a campaign against Santiago. On the Mediterranean shore, the naval defense was centered at the base of al-Mariya, now Almería. The dockyards of the fleet had been built in Tortosa in 944. The fleet of the Caliphate also maintained a significant budget under Almanzor.

Initially, the maritime defense of the Caliphate was led by Abd al-Rahman ibn Muhammad ibn Rumahis, a veteran admiral who had served Al-Hakam II and was Qadi of Elvira and Pechina. He repulsed raids by al-Magus (idolaters) or al-Urdumaniyun ("men of the north", Vikings), in the west of al-Andalus in mid-971. When there was another invasion later that year, the Umayyad admiral left Almería and defeated them off the coast of Algarve. In April 973, he transported the army of Ghalib from Algeciras to subdue the rebellious tribes of the Maghreb and end Fatimid ambitions in that area.

In 985, the fleet ravaged the Catalans. During the Catalan campaign, Gausfred I, Count of Empurias and Roussillon tried to raise an army to help but several flotillas of Berber pirates threatened their coasts, forcing them to stay to defend their lands. In 997 the al-Andalusi fleet hit the Galician coast.

Almanzor eliminated figures who could have opposed his reforms, such as killing Ghalib. Almanzor also replaced the governor of Zaragoza after he collaborated with his eldest son to replace him with a member of the same clan, the Banu Tujib. The admiral of the fleet was also poisoned in January 980 and replaced.

Land transport routes were dotted with strongholds, and dignitaries controlled communications. Messengers were bought in and specially trained to handle Almanzor's messages and to transmit the official reports that his foreign ministries wrote about the annual campaigns.

=== Collapse ===
The title of caliph became symbolic, without power or influence. Almanzor's temporal power increased the importance of the military, both as a symbol of the power of Almanzor and an instrument to guarantee the payment of taxes. The chamberlain's court also rivaled that of the caliph. Almanzor's reforms also divided the population into two unequal groups: a large mass of civilian taxpayers and a small professional military caste, generally from outside the peninsula and not particularally loyal to the polity.

Following Almanzor's death in 1002, the institutions he created stagnated under internal divisions from military and political factions competing for power.

The power of the chamberlain was retained by Almanzor's sons, Abd al-Malik al-Muzaffar, who died in 1008, and Abd al-Rahman Sanchuelo. While Abd al-Rahman was leading a raid on the Christian north, a revolt tore through Córdoba and deposed him, and he was killed when he tried to restore himself to power.

The death of Abd al-Rahman Sanchuelo in 1009 marked the beginning of the Fitna of al-Andalus, with rival claimants proclaiming themselves to be the new caliph, violence sweeping the caliphate, and intermittent invasions by the Hammudid dynasty. Córdoban forces were also joined in the civil war by contingents of Christian mercenaries. Beset by factionalism, the caliphate crumbled in 1031 into a number of independent taifas, including the Taifa of Córdoba, Taifa of Seville and Taifa of Zaragoza. The last Córdoban Caliph was Hisham III, who reigned from 1027 to 1031.

== Society ==
Under Umayyad rule, Arabization and Islamization progressed significantly in al-Andalus. In the long-term, these were to comprise the two major aspects of Andalusi identity and eventually characterized most of the population.

=== Population estimates ===
At the time of the Muslim invasion in the 8th century, Iberia had an estimated four million inhabitants. Other historians estimate higher at around seven or eight million. Around 1000 CE, the caliphate occupied some four hundred thousand square kilometers and, by one estimate, was populated by around three million people. At the same time, the Iberian Christian states comprised 160,000 square kilometers and around 500,000 people. Spanish historian Manuel Colmeiro y Penido estimated that in a pre-industrial society, for every million inhabitants, ten thousand soldiers could be mustered. Even assuming the chronicles exaggerated tenfold the real numbers – these speak of eight hundred thousand soldiers – the caliphate could have had eight million inhabitants. Those who use more bullish criteria estimate between seven and 10 million.

The population of the capital city Córdoba most likely surpassed 100,000 in the 10th century, making it the largest city in Europe alongside Constantinople, capital of the Byzantine Empire. Tertius Chandler estimated that circa 1000 CE, Córdoba held around 450,000 people. Under Almanzor, the realm had other large cities like Toledo, Almería and Granada, which were all around 30,000; and Zaragoza, Valencia and Málaga, all above 15,000. This contrasted sharply with the Christian north of the Iberian Peninsula, which lacked large urban centers.

=== Language ===
The adoption of the Arabic language, though gradual, was a wide-reaching phenomenon of long-term importance. Arabic spread primarily through conversion to Islam. While Alvarus of Cordoba lamented in the 9th century that Christians were no longer using Latin, Richard Bulliet estimates that only 50% of the population of al-Andalus had converted to Islam by the death in 961 of Abd al-Rahman III, the last emir of the Umayyads in Cordoba. Arabic-speakers in al-Andalus developed vernacular varieties of Arabic, referred to as Andalusi Arabic, that were within the Maghrebi Arabic continuum but particular to al-Andalus. The standard Classical Arabic was promoted as a language of administration, literature, and cultivation. Andalusi Arabic came to exist in a situation of bilingualism with Andalusi Romance, Ibero-Romance as spoken in al-Andalus. Romance, continued to be spoken especially in rural lower classes, but Arabic had become the language of the middle and upper classes. By the end of the century, even the Christian population was so widely Arabized that their clergy were required to translate religious texts into Arabic.

=== Ethnic composition ===
The early population of al-Andalus at the outset of Umayyad rule had several main constituents: Arabs, Berbers, indigenous converts to Islam, indigenous Christians, and Jews. The Andalusis of Arab origin were a minority but they had formed the ruling elites since the Muslim conquest in the early 8th century. Berbers, who had made up the majority of the conquering army, were a larger group, relatively powerful but less so than the Arab elites. The indigenous population were the majority, but the proportion of Christians among them decreased over time as many of them converted to Islam. The indigenous Muslim converts were known as Muwallads (Arabic: مولد) and became very numerous in later generations. Some of them were descended from the former Visigothic and Hispano-Roman landholding elites that existed prior to the Muslim conquest and who had retained much of their status after the conquest. Jews were present in smaller numbers relative to the other groups. According to Thomas Glick, "Despite the withdrawal of substantial numbers during the drought and famine of the 750s, fresh Berber migration from North Africa was a constant feature of Andalusi history, increasing in tempo in the tenth century. Hispano-Romans who converted to Islam, numbering six or seven millions, comprised the majority of the population and also occupied the lowest rungs on the social ladder."

While the indigenous Jews, Christians, and Muwallads were largely organized into family-based social structures, the Arabs and Berbers were organized into a more complex mix of family and tribe loyalties. "Arab" identity in general was largely tied to the assertion of Arab ancestry. This lineage was perceived as inherited through the father, meaning that children of Arab men and non-Arab women were still considered Arabs, although the lineage of the mother, if she came from another noble or elite background, could still be seen as prestigious.

Beyond the heartland of Cordoba, the makeup of the population varied depending on the region. The northern limit of Muslim settlement generally extended along a frontier that ran to the north of the Tagus river in the west, around the Cordillera Central in the center, and before the foothills of the Pyrenees in the east. The region along the western frontier, known as the Lower March and including the modern-day province of Extremadura, was largely rural with the exception of the city of Mérida. Ethnic Arabs were (at least during the early Emirate period) sparse here and the Muslim population consisted mostly of Berbers, probably semi-nomadic or transhumant, and of Muwallads. The region along the central frontier, near Toledo, also known as the Middle March, was again only sparsely inhabited by Arabs. The city and local politics were dominated by Muwallads, while the rural highlands were generally the domain of Berber tribes. To the northeast, the Upper March, centered around Zaragoza and the Ebro river valley, contained more cities and a more diverse population, including Arabs, Berbers, and Muwallads. Among the latter were powerful families who dominated the area's politics throughout the Islamic period. The hills and mountains up north were usually inhabited by Christians.

=== Religion ===
==== Islam ====
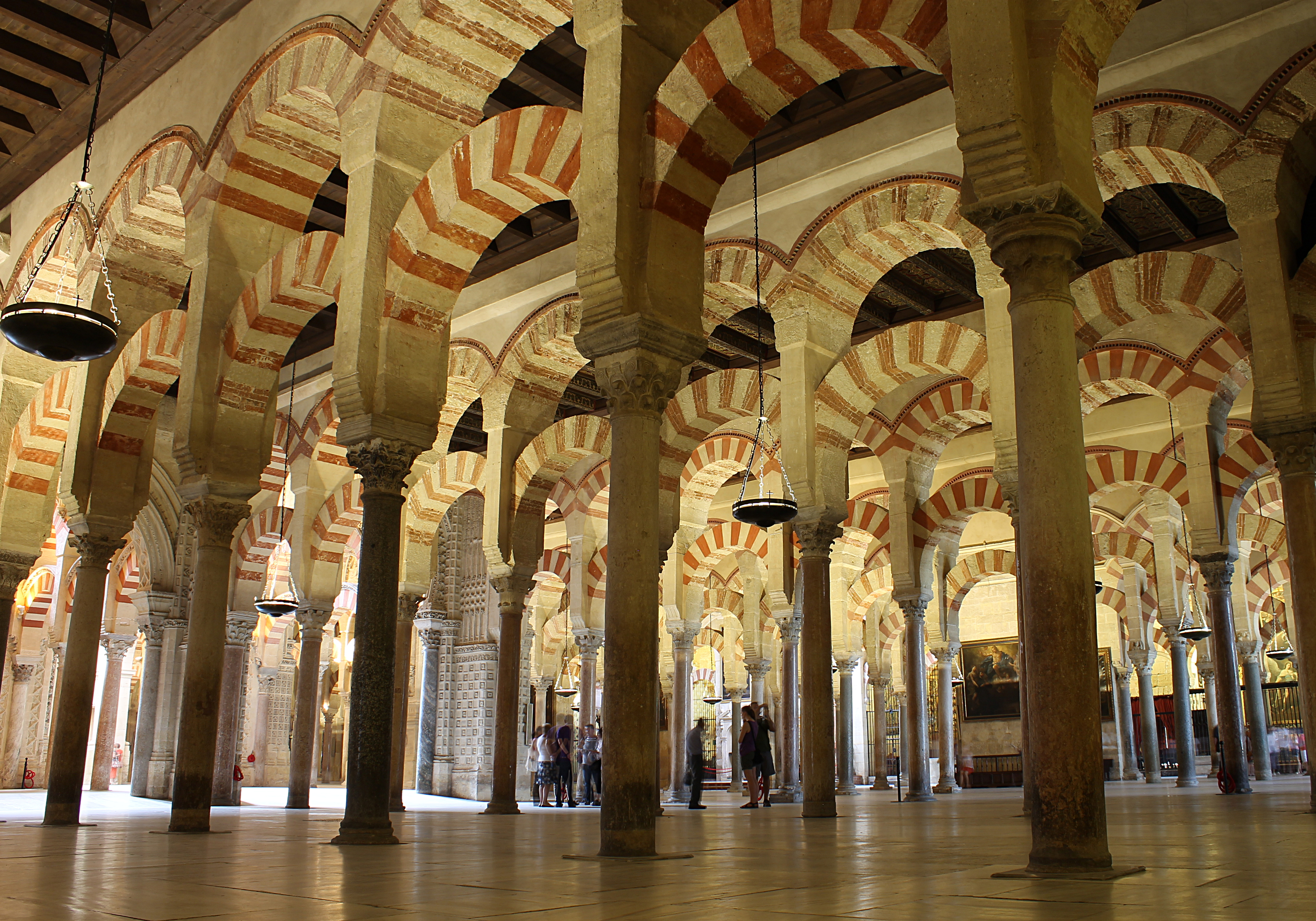
The Grand Mosque of Cordoba's hypostyle hall with two-tiered arches in the original section of the mosque built under Emir Abd al-Rahman I

In matters of Islamic religion, the ulama (religious scholars) and the fuqaha (judges) played the most important social role. In the 9th century, both the Maliki and the Hanafi legal schools of jurisprudence (madhhabs) were common, but the Umayyads themselves promoted the former. One reason for this might be that Hanafism was seen as too closely associated with the Abbasids, whom the Umayyads considered enemies. Maliki dominance solidified under the reign of Abd ar-Rahman II in the 9th century, though during the reign of his son, Muhammad I, the Shafi'i and Zahiri schools were also introduced. Malikism eventually became another core characteristic of Andalusi identity and its spread contributed to the Islamization of the country.

==== Christians and Jews ====
As elsewhere in the historic Islamic world, Jews and Christians were considered by Muslims to be People of the Book who took on the status of dhimmis or "protected non-Muslims". In exchange for the state's protection, they were required to pay a tax called the jizya. Their religious practices were tolerated but conspicuous displays of faith, such as bells and processions, were discouraged.

The local Christian Catholic Church in al-Andalus was partially integrated with the Umayyad regime and its leaders collaborated with the Arab-Muslim elites. Bishops often acted as administrators and political envoys and their appointment was overseen by the Umayyad state. While the Catholic Church retained its internal unity, the advent of Islamic rule weakened its monopoly on religious authority over the Christian communities in al-Andalus, resulting in many deviations from orthodox practice and the emergence of both old and new heterodoxies which co-existed alongside official church doctrine.

The Arabized Christians of the Iberian Peninsula were later referred to as Mozarabs, from Arabic must'arab (Arabic: مُسْتَعْرَب, lit. 'Arabized'). The term "Mozarab" has been used by historians in various ways since the 19th century and can refer to either the Christian population living under Muslim rule, who did not call themselves by this name, or to the Arabized Christians that emigrated from al-Andalus to the Christian kingdoms in northern Iberia. The term "Mozarabic" is also used to refer to the Andalusi dialect of Romance that was spoken by Christians in al-Andalus, to the Mozarabic liturgy that was a continuation of the Visigothic rite, and to Mozarabic art and architecture, a fusion of Christian and Islamic artistic and architectural styles brought by Christian emigrants from al-Andalus to northern Iberia.

While Christians saw their status decline from their rule under the Visigoths, the status of Jews improved. While Jews were persecuted under the Visigoths, Jewish communities benefited from Umayyad rule by obtaining more freedom, affluence and a higher social standing. Not much is known about the Jewish communities in al-Andalus before the 10th century, though they must have been an important presence. Historical records attest that they were present in Córdoba in the 9th century. During the caliphal period, some Jews entered into the circles of the caliph's court, of whom the most influential was Hasdai ibn Shaprut.

==== Conversion ====
The Muslim proportion of al-Andalus's population grew during Umayyad rule as native Iberians converted to Islam. As in many other lands in the early Islamic era, conversion to Islam was likely motivated primarily by social and economic considerations. As the number of converts grew, the reasons to convert likely became stronger and the process became self-reinforcing. Indigenous elites had been among the first to convert as a way to preserve their status. As Christian institutions weakened and the Islamic presence became clearly more permanent, a steady drift towards Islam likely took place in the rest of the Christian population seeking improved social status and economic opportunities.

Historical sources provide little data on which to estimate the rate of conversion, but a study by Richard Bulliet has put forward a possible model of this process. It suggests that by the beginning of the 9th century only some 8% of the indigenous population had converted but that the curve of conversion increased in the second half of the 9th century, resulting in about 25% conversion around the year 900, roughly 50% towards 950, and around 75% by 1000, after which conversion slowed. Half of the population in Córdoba is reported to have been Muslim by the 10th century, with an increase to 70 percent by the 11th century, though this was due less to local conversion than to Muslim immigration from the rest of the Iberian Peninsula and North Africa.

=== Social status ===
The elite political and social circles that formed around the Umayyads in Córdoba were known as the khāṣṣa (Arabic: الخاص). They were largely Arab, though they were also joined by individuals of non-Arab origin who climbed through the political ranks. Among the latter were various mawālī (sing. mawlā), or "clients" sponsored by powerful families. These were often Muslim converts and, unlike its connotations in the Middle East, the term mawlā in al-Andalus typically implied an elite status. Some powerful Berber leaders and scholars were also able to join the ranks of the political elites.

Slavery was also a regular feature of Andalusi society and al-Andalus was a center of the slave trade in the Western Mediterranean, particularly in the 10th century when the caliphate played a major role in international trade. Merchants of many backgrounds (Jewish, Muslim, and Christian) participated in this trade. Historical sources attest that slaves were commonly employed in wealthy households and especially at the royal court, but little is known of what role they may have played in industries such as agriculture and mining. Most slaves of this period were captured during Muslim raids on the Christian kingdoms in the northern Iberian Peninsula or were imported from other European markets. These European slaves were known as ṣaqāliba (Arabic: صقالبة) and were highly valued. Some were castrated and sold as eunuchs, considered a very prized commodity. The latter were an integral part of Umayyad palace society and played an important role in courtly politics, including in the matter of dynastic succession, where they often allied with the women whose sons were potential candidates for the throne. All the mothers of Umayyad emirs and caliphs were also originally slaves. In the context of elite society, slave origins held no social stigma and women could become very powerful in the household and the court. Slave girls that were considered particularly prized or gifted were usually given an extensive education in arts and literature, as was also common in the court of the Abbasid caliphs. Black African slaves, known as 'abīd, were also purchased and imported to al-Andalus, but they were less numerous than the ṣaqāliba and mostly trained to serve as military troops.

== Economy ==
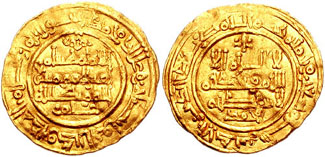
Gold dinar of Hisham II, dated 396 AH (1006–1007 CE)

The economy of al-Andalus had been monetized by the end of the 8th century, but it was not until the 10th century that both gold and silver coins were minted, thanks in large part to the flow of gold from trans-Saharan trade. A new mint was established at Madinat al-Zahra circa 947 CE (336 AH), though it was moved back to Córdoba circa 975–976 CE (365 AH).

The state also benefited greatly from trade with the rest of the Islamic world to the east. In addition to exporting crafted goods (primarily silk cloth), it provided raw materials to North Africa and the Middle East, regions that were poorer in natural resources than al-Andalus. This trade advantage promoted a higher standard of living, which in turn attracted more skilled labour to the country. Córdoba also drew revenues from tributes collected from the Christian kingdoms to the north, which provided silver and slaves. One historical source reports that the state's total revenues at the end of Abd al-Rahman III's reign amounted to six and a half million dinars – though it's unclear what this figure means precisely in terms of purchasing power.

Some of the most prominent merchants of the caliphate were Jews. Jewish merchants had extensive networks of trade that stretched the length of the Mediterranean Sea. Since there was no international banking system at the time, payments relied on a high level of trust, and this level of trust could only be cemented through personal or family bonds, such as marriage. Jews from al-Andalus, Cairo, and the Levant all intermarried across borders. Therefore, Jewish merchants in the caliphate had counterparts abroad that were willing to do business with them.

The agricultural revolution that occurred in al-Andalus following the arrival of the Arabs and Berbers was of major importance to both society and the economy. The combination of new crops; including rice, hard wheat, bananas, watermelons, oranges, and more; and new and more widespread irrigation techniques, including the use of norias (a type of waterwheel) meant that agricultural output was greater, more consistent, and took place during a longer part of the year. This ensured that the population was healthier and less vulnerable to famine, encouraging demographic growth, while farmers reaped higher incomes and were able to further diversify their production. Some crops, such as figs, were cultivated as cash crops.

== Culture ==
In high society, both men and women were expected to learn adab, a kind of formal social etiquette common to al-Andalus and other Islamic societies at the time. Women, such as royal concubines, were sometimes sent abroad to be trained in adab and other forms of high culture.

Al-Andalus was subject to eastern cultural influences, with Abd al-Rahman I likely having an interest in Syrian culture. During the reign of Abd al-Rahman II the culture of Baghdad became fashionable, and his reign is considered a high point of culture and patronage during the Emirate period. The musician Ziryab was a "major trendsetter of his time" creating trends in fashion, hairstyles, and hygiene. His students took these trends with them throughout Europe and North Africa. He also founded an academy for arts, music, and fashion which lasted for several generations. The legacy of Ziryab and figures like him was continued into the 9th century by bringing in new styles of art, music, and literature from the eastern Islamic world.

=== Literature and scholarship ===
Córdoba was the cultural and intellectual center of al-Andalus, with translations of ancient Greek texts into Arabic, Latin and Hebrew. The emir Abd al-Rahman II sent emissaries to the Abbasid and Byzantine courts to bring back books on subjects such as Islamic religious scholarship, Arabic grammar, poetry, astrology, medicine, and other sciences. Abbas ibn Firnas was among the most notable polymaths of this period who brought back technical and scientific knowledge back with him from the east.

In the 10th century, Córdoba became one of the centers of culture and high society in the Islamic world. Al-Andalus's prosperity and the caliph's patronage attracted travelers, diplomats and scholars. Advances in science, history, geography, philosophy, and language also occurred during the Caliphate. During the reign of al-Hakam II, the royal library possessed an estimated 400,000 to 500,000 volumes. For comparison, the Abbey of Saint Gall in Switzerland contained just over 100 volumes.

Poets sought the patronage of the caliph's court, as with the example of Ibn Darraj al-Qastali, who served as court poet for Abd al-Rahman III, Al-Hakam II, and Almanzor. Other poets, such as Yusuf al-Ramadi, composed works on nature and love. Muwashshah, a form of Andalusi vernacular poetry combining vernacular Arabic and the vernacular Romance language, grew more popular during this period. Writers also began to compose histories devoted to the Umayyad dynasty of Al-Andalus, such as Ahmad al-Razi's History of the Rulers of al-Andalus (Arabic: أخبار ملوك الأندلس, romanized: Akhbār mulūk al-Andalus). These histories also provided information on the land and its people. Many ideas and myths concerning the history of al-Andalus, including stories about its initial Muslim conquest in the 8th century, began to appear in this period.

Christians and Jews contributed to the intellectual and cultural spheres of al-Andalus, although this required that they publicly respect the higher status of the Arabic language and of the Islamic religion. Hasdai ibn Shaprut was one of the most well-known Jewish figures of this time. In addition to serving in the caliph's court and being highly versed in Arabic culture, Hasdai was also a patron of Hebrew scholarship. He was determined to establish the Jewish community of al-Andalus as independent from the Jewish academies of Baghdad and the Middle East, which helped bring about the Golden Age of Jewish culture in the region. By contrast, Latin culture within Al-Andalus declined as local Christians became increasingly Arabized. The Latin language was retained in liturgy. However, Andalusi Christians did journey to and from the Christian-controlled territories to the north and in the rest of Europe, contributing to the transmission of knowledge from al-Andalus to the rest of Europe.

Some upper-class women also had the resources to receive education and participate in high culture in the domains of poetry and even religion. Examples include 'Aisha ibn Ahmad, who was born from a noble family and wrote poetry, copied the Qur'an, and founded libraries. Lubna, a slave in the service of al-Hakam II, served as one of the caliph's scribes (or secretaries) and a librarian. Although religious domains were still dominated by men, Fatima bint Yahya al-Maghami was a well-known faqih (expert on Islamic law and jurisprudence) who taught both men and women. Under al-Hakam II, some female slaves could also receive an education in calligraphy, astronomy, medicine, or various other sciences.

=== Arts ===
In the 9th century, Abd al-Rahman II established a workshop that produced official embroidered textiles known as tiraz, a custom that also existed in the east. In the 10th century, the caliph's official workshops, such as those at Madinat al-Zahra, fabricated luxury products for use at court or as gifts for guests, allies, and diplomats, which stimulated artistic production. Many objects produced in the caliph's workshops later made their way into the collections of museums and Christian cathedrals in Europe. Among the most famous objects of this period are ivory boxes which are carved with vegetal, figurative, and epigraphic motifs. Notable surviving examples include the Pyxis of al-Mughira, the Pyxis of Zamora, and the Leyre Casket.

The caliphal workshops also produced fine silks, including tiraz textiles, ceramics, and leatherwork. Metalwork objects were also produced, of which the most famous surviving piece is the so-called "Córdoba Stag", a bronze fountain spout carved in the form of a stag which was made at Madinat al-Zahra and preserved by the Archeological Museum of Córdoba. Two other bronze examples of similar craftsmanship, shaped like deer, are kept at the National Archeological Museum in Madrid and the Islamic Art Museum in Doha. While the production of ivory and silk objects largely stopped after the Caliphate's collapse, production in other mediums like leather and ceramic continued in later periods.

Marble was also carved for decorative elements in some buildings, such as wall paneling and window grilles. One of the most prolific types of marble craftsmanship were capitals, which continued the general configuration of Roman Corinthian capitals but were deeply carved with Islamic vegetal motifs (known as ataurique in Spanish) in a distinctive style associated with the caliphal period. These capitals later became prized spolia and can be found in later buildings across the region built under the Almoravids and Almohads. Another notable example is a marble basin, now kept at the Dar Si Said Museum in Marrakesh, which was crafted at Madinat al-Zahra between 1002 and 1007 to serve as an ablutions basin and dedicated to 'Abd al-Malik, the son of al-Mansur, before being shipped to Morocco and re-used in new buildings.

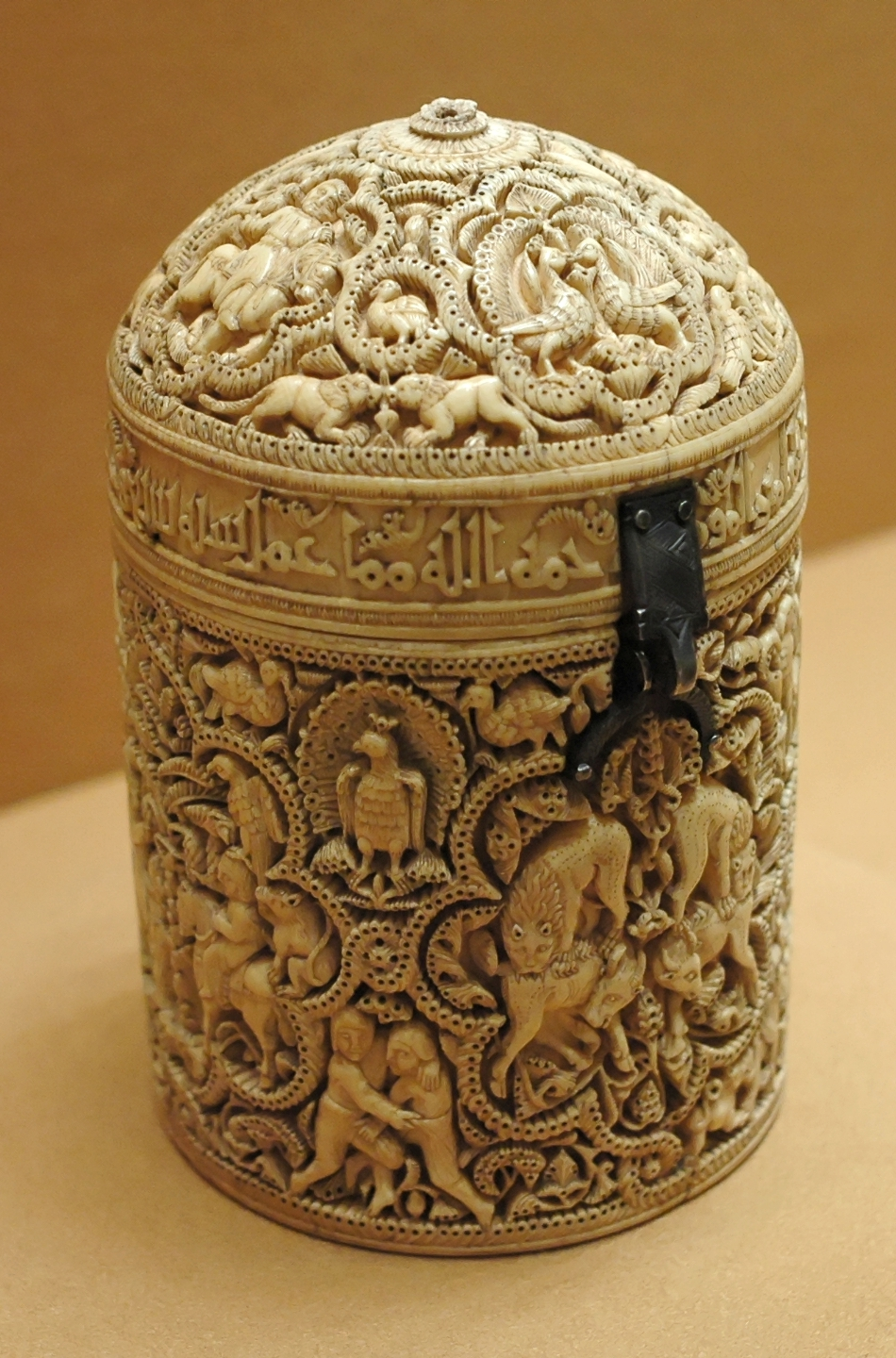
The Pyxis of al-Mughira, a carved ivory casket made at Madinat al-Zahra dated to 968

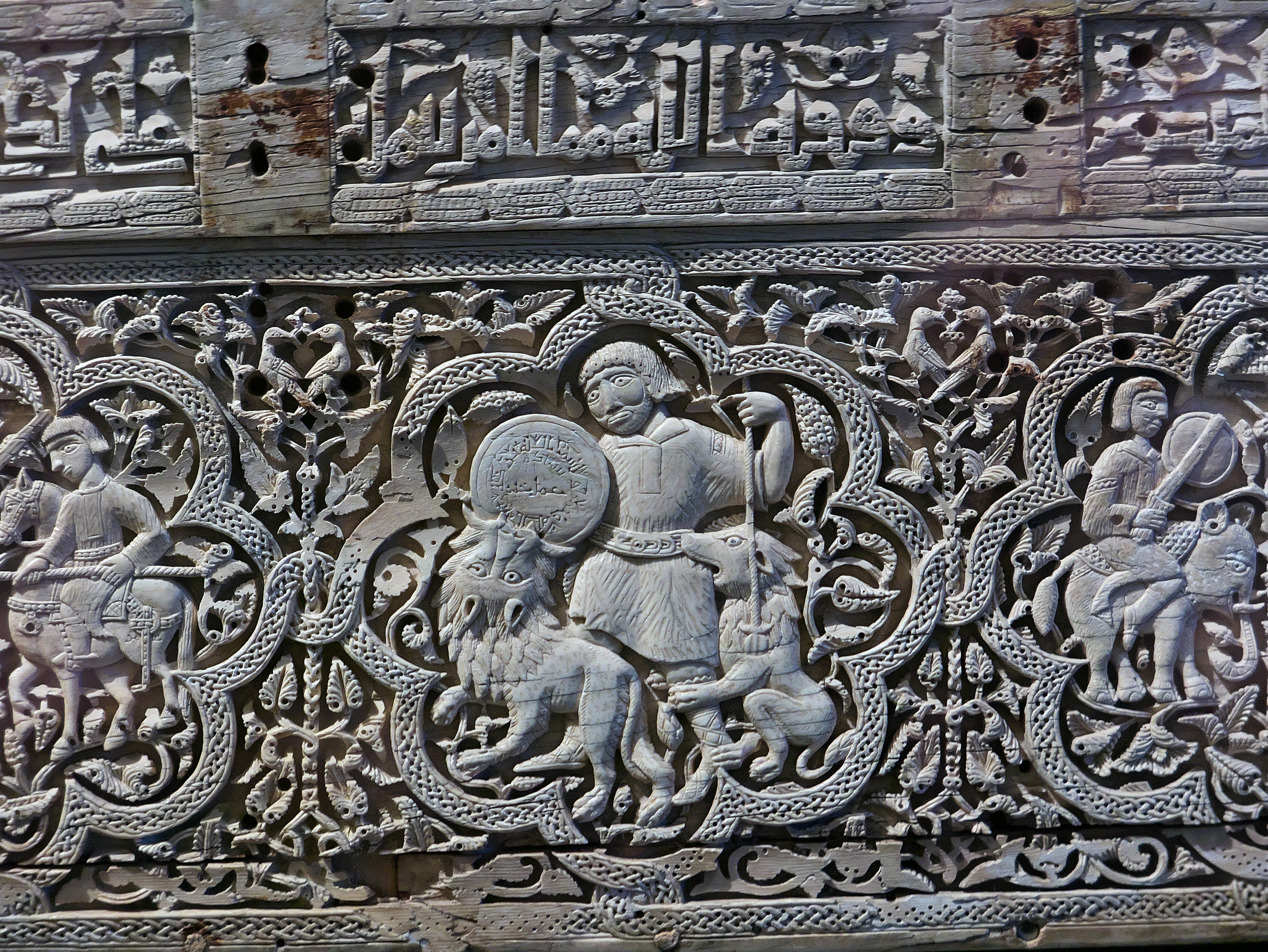
Vegetal motifs and figurative imagery carved in ivory on the Leyre Casket, made in 1004–1005

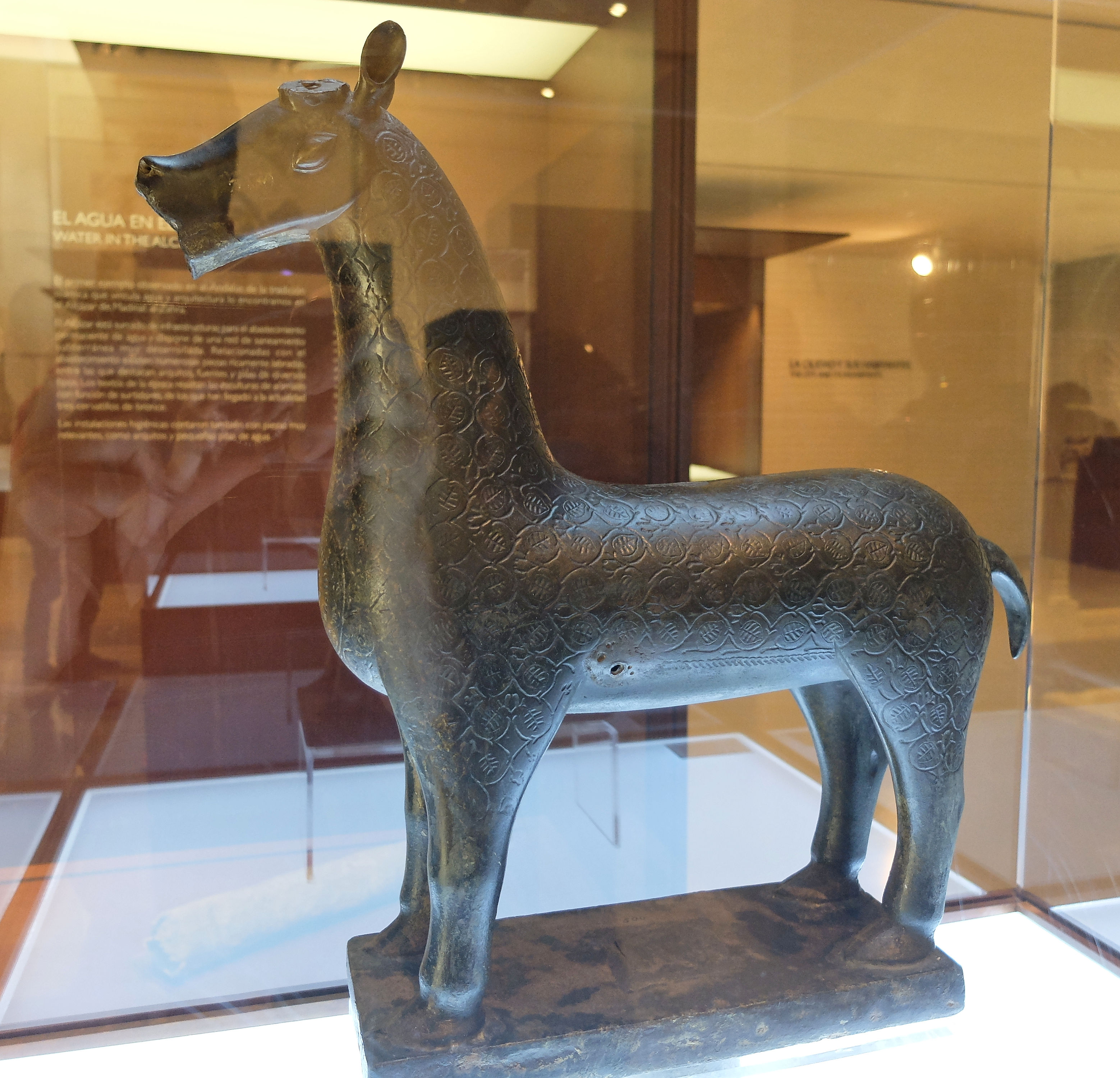
The "Stag of Córdoba", a bronze fountain spout from Madinat al-Zahra (10th century)

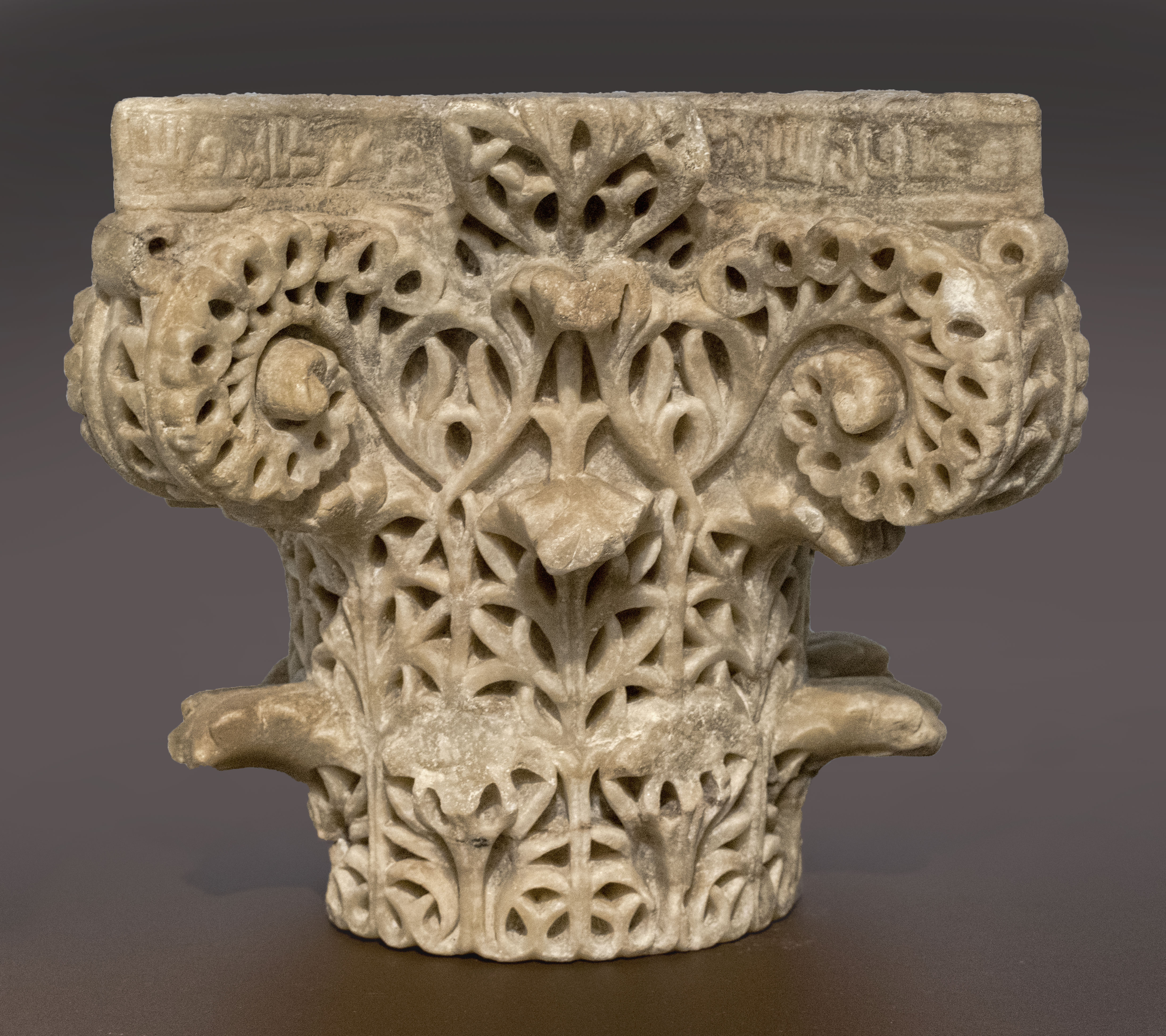
Example of a marble capital from Madinat al-Zahra, 10th century

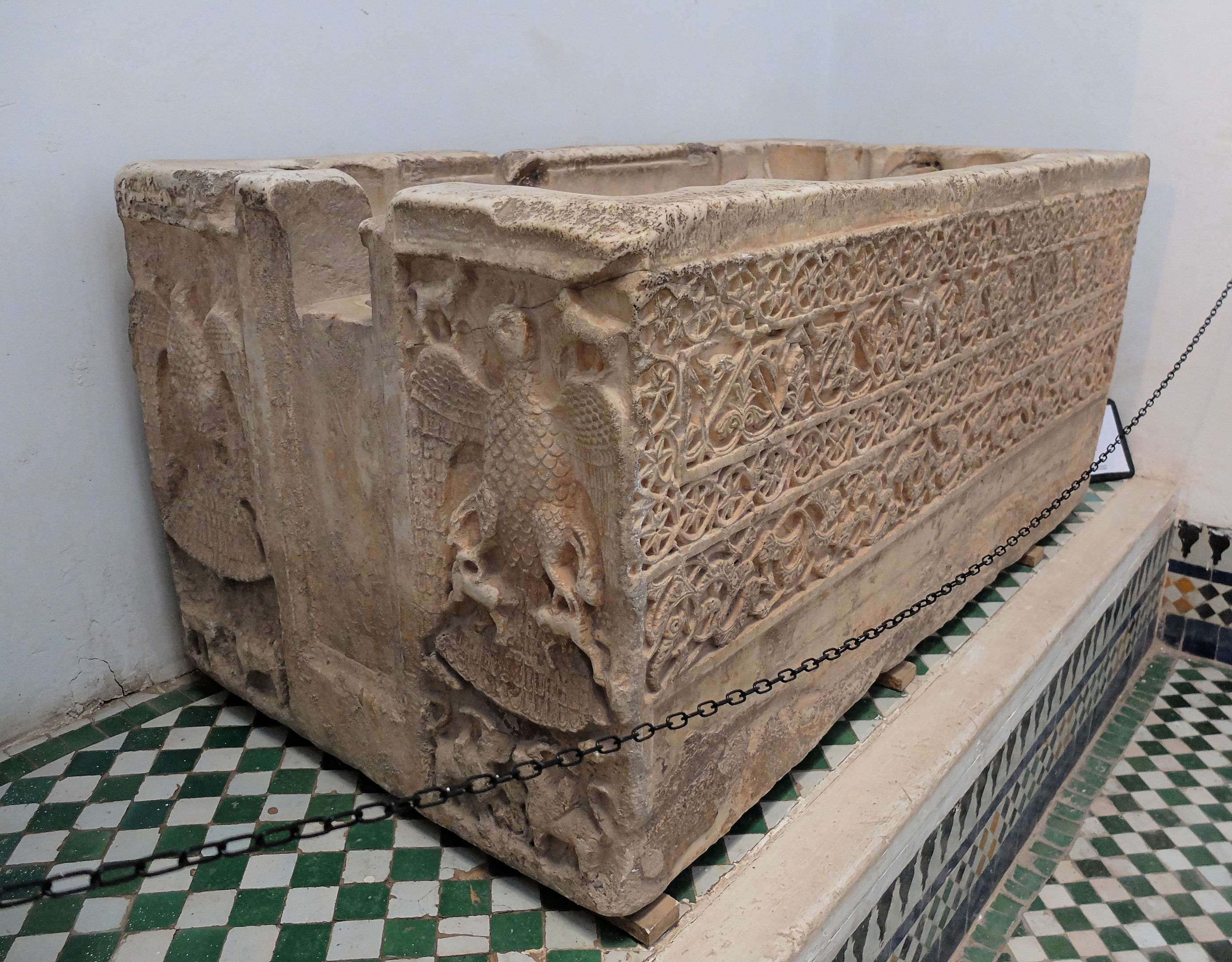
Marble basin crafted for 'Abd al-Malik (son of al-Mansur) between 1002 and 1007

=== Architecture ===
==== Emirate period ====
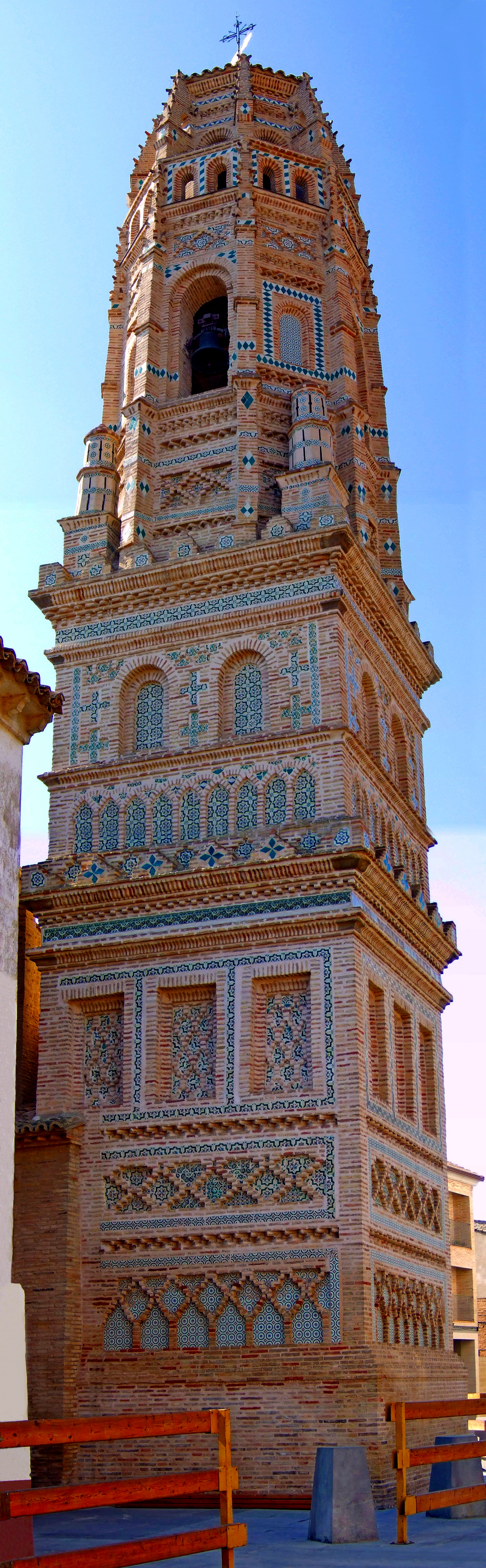
The Utebo Mosque reconverted into the Church of Our Lady of the Assumption, this re-dedication in architecture is named Mudéjar

Upon rising to power, Abd al-Rahman I initially resided in several palace-villas on the outskirts of Cordoba, most notably one called ar-Ruṣāfa. Ar-Ruṣāfa may have originally been a Roman villa or a Roman-Visigothic estate which was taken over and adapted by a Berber chieftain named Razin al-Burnusi who accompanied the original Muslim invasion by Tariq ibn Ziyad earlier that century. After a failed plot against him in 784, Abd al-Rahman I moved his residence definitively to the site of the Alcázar in the city. He and his successors built and continuously developed the Alcázar into the official royal residence and seat of power in Al-Andalus. Abd al-Rahman II was responsible for improving the water supply for both the city and the palace gardens. He may have also built the Albolafia as well as other norias (waterwheels) along the Guadalquivir River. (Note: The present-day Albolafia's origin is uncertain and historians differ on the most likely date of its construction. While one hypothesis attributes it the 9th century around the time of Abd al-Rahman II, other hypotheses have attributed its origin to the 10th century, the 12th century under the Almoravids, or to the 14th century under the Castilians.)

In 785, Abd al-Rahman I founded the Great Mosque of Cordoba, one of the most important monuments of the architecture of the western Islamic world. The mosque was notable for its vast hypostyle hall composed of rows of columns connected by double tiers of arches (including horseshoe arches on the lower tier) composed of alternating red brick and light-colored stone. The mosque was subsequently expanded by Abd al-Rahman II in 836, who preserved the original design while extending its dimensions. The mosque was again embellished with new features by his successors Muhammad I, Al-Mundhir, and Abdallah. One of the western gates of the mosque, known as Bab al-Wuzara' (today known as Puerta de San Esteban), dates from the 9th century expansion and is often noted as an important prototype of later Moorish architectural forms and motifs.

The palaces and the Great Mosque in Cordoba were linked via a high covered passage (sabbat) which was raised over the street between them, allowing the caliph direct access to the maqsurah area of the mosque via a corridor behind the qibla wall. The first sabbat was built by the Umayyad emir Abdallah (r. 888–912) for security reasons and was later replaced by al-Hakam II when the latter expanded the mosque.

The original Great Mosque of Seville, (Note: Not to be confused with the later Almohad Great Mosque (12th century) which was subsequently converted into the Seville Cathedral.) also known as the Ibn Addabas Mosque, was either built or enlarged by Abd al-Rahman II c. 830. It is now occupied by the Collegiate Church of the Divine Savior (Iglesia Colegial del Salvador), which preserves minor remains of the mosque. In Mérida, following a violent revolt, Abd al-Rahman II also built a fortress, now known as the Alcazaba of Mérida, which was later re-used by the Knights of Santiago and remains standing today.

==== Caliphal period ====
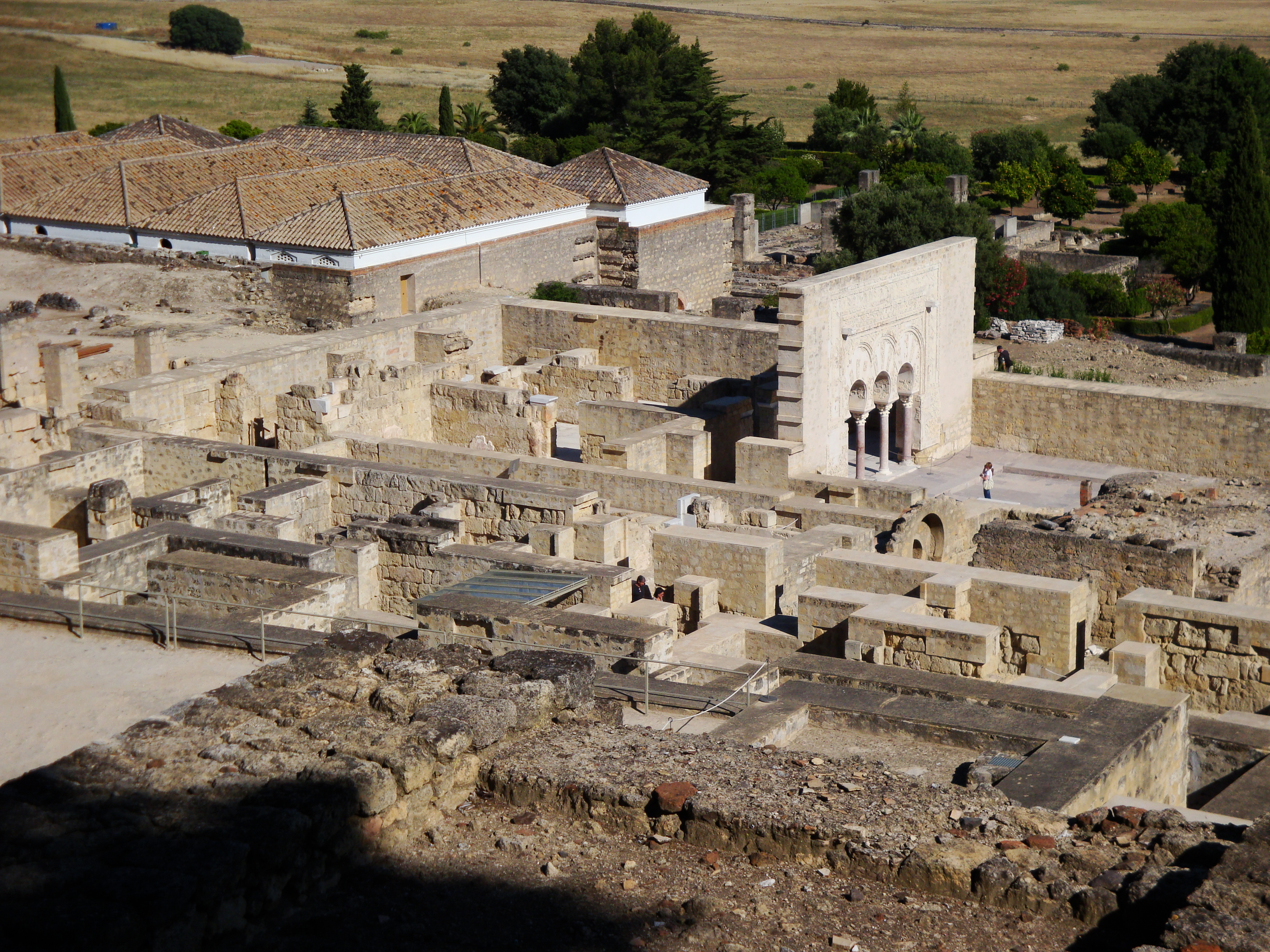
The excavated and partly reconstructed remains of Madinat al-Zahra, outside Córdoba, Spain (10th century)

Abd al-Rahman III marked his political ascendancy with the creation of a vast and lavish palace-city called Madinat al-Zahra (also spelled and pronounced today as "Medina Azahara"), located just outside Córdoba. Construction began in 936–940 and continued in multiple phases throughout his reign and the reign of his son, Al-Hakam II (r. 961–976). The new city included ceremonial reception halls, a congregational mosque, administrative and government offices, aristocratic residences, gardens, a mint, workshops, barracks, service quarters, and baths. In the old Alcázar of Cordoba, modern excavations have also uncovered the remains of the Caliphal Baths dating from the 10th century (with later additions).

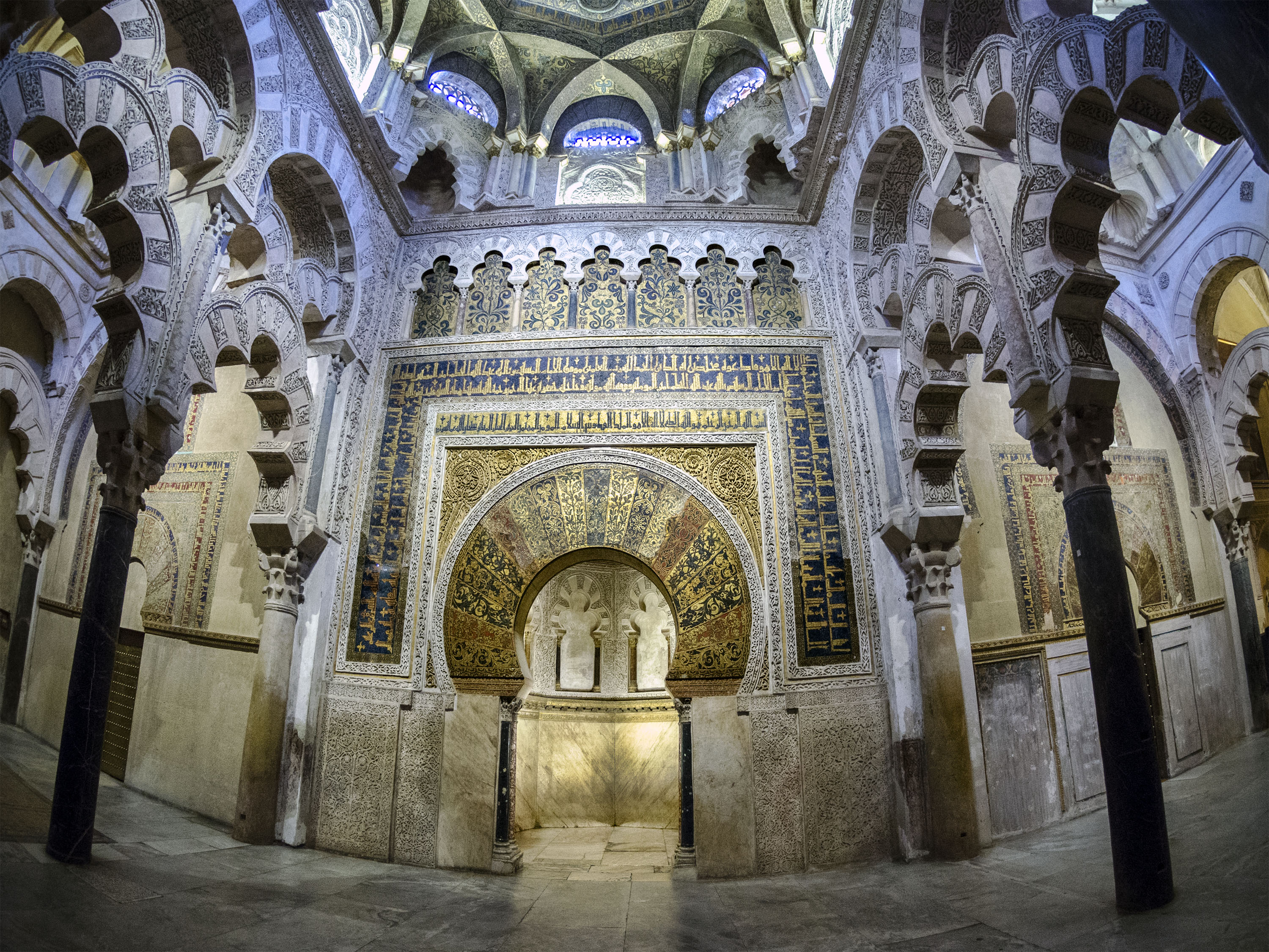
The mosaic-decorated mihrab (center) and the interlacing arches of the maqsura in the Great Mosque of Cordoba, in the extension added by al-Hakam II after 962

He also expanded the courtyard (sahn) of Córdoba's Great Mosque and built its first true minaret (a tower from which the call to prayer was issued). The minaret, with a square floor plan, set another precedent that was followed in the architecture of other mosques in the region. Abd ar Rahman III's cultured successor, al-Hakam II, further expanded the mosque's prayer hall, starting in 962. He endowed it with some of its most significant architectural flourishes and innovations, which included interlacing multifoil arches, decorative ribbed domes, and a richly-ornamented mihrab (niche symbolizing the direction of prayer) with Byzantine-influenced gold mosaics.

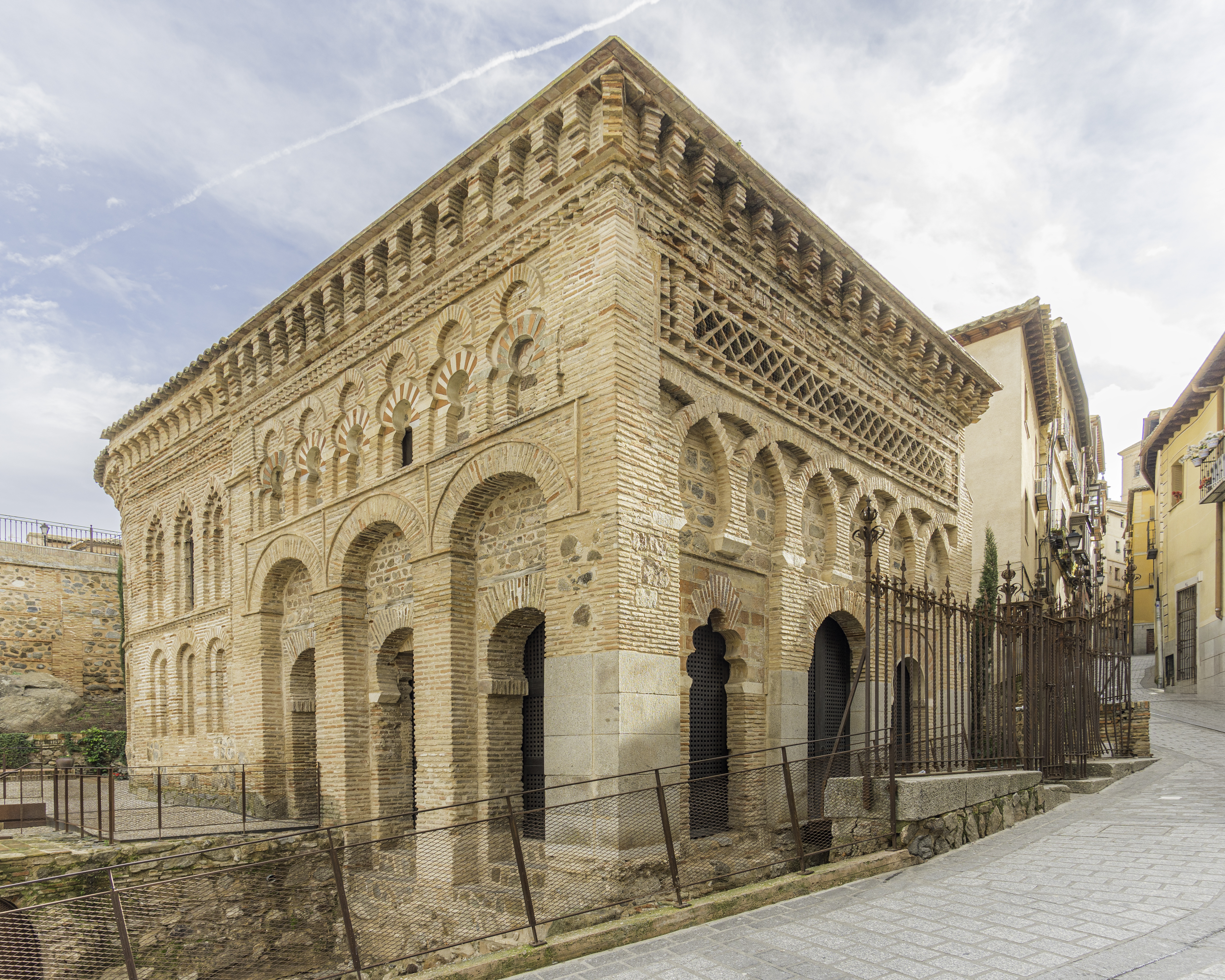
Bab al-Mardum Mosque (also known today as the Cristo de la Luz) in Toledo (c. 1000)

A much smaller but historically notable work from the late caliphate period is the Bab al-Mardum Mosque (later known as the Church of San Cristo de la Luz) in Toledo, dated to 999–1000, which features a variety of ribbed domes resting on horseshoe arches and an exterior façade with Arabic inscriptions carved in brick. Other monuments from the Caliphate period in al-Andalus include several of Toledo's old city gates, the former mosque (and later monastery) of Almonaster la Real, the Castle of Tarifa, the Castle of Baños de la Encina (near Seville), the Caliphal Baths of Córdoba, and, possibly, the Baths of Jaen.

In the 10th century much of northern Morocco also came directly within the sphere of influence of the Córdoban Caliphate, with competition from the Fatimid Caliphate further east. Early contributions to Moroccan architecture from this period include expansions to the Qarawiyyin and Andalusiyyin mosques in Fes and the addition of their square-shafted minarets, carried out under the sponsorship of Abd al-Rahman III and following the example of the minaret he built for the Great Mosque of Córdoba.

== List of rulers ==
=== Emirs (756–929) ===
==== Umayyad dynasty ====
1. Abd al-Rahman I, son of Mu'awiya ibn Hisham, 756–788
2. Hisham I, son of Abd al-Rahman I, 788–796
3. Al-Hakam I, son of Hisham I, 796–822
4. Abd al-Rahman II, son of al-Hakam I, 822–852
5. Muhammad I, son of Abd al-Rahman II, 852–886
6. Al-Mundhir, son of Muhammad I, 886–888
7. Abd Allah, son of Muhammad I, 888–912
8. Abd al-Rahman III, grandson of Abd Allah, 912–929

=== Caliphs (929–1031) ===
==== Umayyad dynasty ====
1. Abd al-Rahman III al-Nasir, grandson of Abd Allah, 929–961
2. Al-Hakam II al-Mustansir, son of Abd al-Rahman III, 961–976
3. Hisham II al-Mu'ayyad, son of al-Hakam II, 976–1009, 1010–1013
4. Muhammad II al-Mahdi, great-grandson of Abd al-Rahman III, 1009, 1010
5. Sulayman al-Musta'in, great-grandson of Abd al-Rahman III, 1009–1010, 1013–1016
6. Abd al-Rahman IV al-Murtada, great-grandson of Abd al-Rahman III, 1018
7. Abd al-Rahman V al-Mustazhir, great-grandson of Abd al-Rahman III, 1023–1024
8. Muhammad III al-Musta'in, great-grandson of Abd al-Rahman III, 1024–1025
9. Hisham III al-Mu'tad, great-grandson of Abd al-Rahman III, 1027–1031

==== Hammudid dynasty ====
1. Ali al-Nasir, descendant of Idris I, 1016–1018
2. Al-Qasim al-Ma'mun, brother of Ali, 1018–1021, 1023
3. Yahya al-Mu'tali, son of Ali, 1021–1023, 1025–1026

There were multiple pretenders after the fall of the caliphate. The Hammudid rulers of Málaga, Bobastro and Algeciras including Idris I al-Muta'ayyad continued to claim the title. The last pretender was Pseudo-Hisham, seated in Seville and installed by Abu al-Qasim Muhammad ibn Abbad, who died around 1059.

== See also ==
- History of Islam
- History of Gibraltar
- History of Algeria
- History of Portugal
- History of Morocco
- History of Spain
- List of Sunni Muslim dynasties
- Martyrs of Córdoba
- Timeline of Septimania
- Reconquista
  - Portugal in the Reconquista
- Sara al-Qutiyya
