= Abd al-Rahman IV =

Ruler of Córdoba (1018–1018)

Abd al-Rahman IV عبد الرحمن المرتضى

Caliph of Córdoba
- Reign: 1018
- Predecessor: Ali ibn Hammud al-Nasir
- Successor: Al-Qasim al-Ma'mun
- Born: 1000s Caliphate of Córdoba
- Died: c. 1018; Cádiz, Caliphate of Córdoba
- Dynasty: Umayyad (Marwanid)
- Father: Muhammad ibn Abd al-Malik ibn Abd al-Rahman III
- Religion: Sunni Islam

Abd al-Rahman ibn Muhammad ibn Abd al-Malik (Arabic: عبد الرحمن بن محمد بن عبد الملك, romanized: ʿAbd al-Raḥmān ibn Muḥammad ibn ʿAbd al-Malik), commonly known as Abd al-Rahman IV, was the Caliph of the Umayyad state of Córdoba in Al-Andalus, succeeding Ali ibn Hammud al-Nasir in 1018.

On 22 March 1018, Ali ibn Hammud al-Nasir the Caliph of Cordoba was assassinated. Six days later, Ali ibn Hammud's brother, Al-Qasim al-Ma'mun claimed the throne. At the same time, conspirators who had been plotting to overthrow Ali ibn Hammud convinced Abd al-Rahman as the great-grandson of Abd al-Rahman III to claim the throne. On 29 April 1018, the conspirators proclaimed Abd al-Rahman IV caliph. Shortly thereafter Abd al-Rahman IV was killed in a campaign to capture Córdoba. Therefore, for a short period at the outset of his reign the throne was contested with two individuals claiming to be caliph.

== Citations ==
Abd al-Rahman IV Caliph of Córdoba Cadet branch of the Umayyad dynasty Died: 1018
Preceded by Ali ibn Hammud al-Nasir	Umayyad Leader	Succeeded by Al-Qasim al-Ma'mun
Preceded by Ali ibn Hammud al-Nasir	Caliph of Córdoba; 1018	Succeeded by Al-Qasim al-Ma'mun
