= Muhammad III of Córdoba =

Ruler of Córdoba (r. 1024–1025)

Muhammad bin 'Abd ar-Rahman bin 'Obayd Allah محمد بن عبد الرحمن بن عبيد الله

10th Caliph of Córdoba
- Reign: January 17, 1024 – May 26, 1025
- Predecessor: Abd al-Rahman V
- Successor: Yahya ibn Ali
- Born: 976
- Died: 1025 (aged 48–49)
- Dynasty: Umayyad (Marwanid)
- Father: Abd ar-Rahman bin Ubayd Allah bin Abd al-Rahman III
- Mother: Hawra
- Religion: Islam

Muhammad bin 'Abd ar-Rahman bin 'Obayd Allah (Arabic: محمد بن عبد الرحمن بن عبيد الله), known as Muhammad III (محمد الثالث) was the 10th Caliph of the Caliphate of Córdoba.

== Background ==
Muhammad III was abruptly selected as caliph on 17 January 1024 when a mob of unemployed workmen attacked the Alcázar palace and deposed the existing caliph, Abd ar-Rahman V. At the time, the capital city of Córdoba was unstable. Intent upon returning the rule of Córdoba back to the Umayyads, the citizens had put Abd ar-Rahman V on the throne in December 1023 and then allowed him to rule only 47 days.

Muhammad III was selected to succeed Abd ar-Rahman V by the mob.

== Reign ==
Muhammad III ruled Córdoba from 1024 to 1025. Muhammad III's reigned was marked by instability, like his predecessor. In May 1025, he learned about a plot by Yahya ibn Ali ibn Hammud al-Mu'tali to depose him and fled, sneaking from Córdoba disguised as a singer.

Weeks later it is believed that Muhammad III was poisoned by a courtier that had accompanied him in his flight.

Muhammad III is known as the father of the famous poet Wallada bint al-Mustakfi, whom he had with an Iberian Christian slave.

== Citations ==
Muhammad III of Córdoba Umayyads of Córdoba Cadet branch of the Banu Umayya
Preceded by Abd-ar-Rahman V	Caliph of Córdoba; 1024–1025	Succeeded by Yahya ibn Ali ibn Hammud al-Mu'tali
