= Al-Mahdi al-Husayn =

Imam of the Zaidi state in Yemen from 1003 to 1013

al-Mahdi al-Husayn (987 - 1013) was an imam of the Zaidi state in Yemen who ruled in the years 1003–1013, in rivalry with another imam.

Like most of the medieval Yemenite imams he was a member of the Rassid line. His genealogy was as follows: Al-Husayn bin Imam al-Qasim bin Ali bin Abdullah bin Muhammad bin Imam al-Qasim al-Rassi bin Ibrahim Tabataba bin Isma'il al-Dibaj bin Ibrahim bin al-Hasan al-Ridha bin Imam al-Hasan bin Imam Ali bin Abi Talib.

Al-Husayn was a Sayyid originally from Tarj, Tihamah. His father was the imam al-Mansur al-Qasim al-Iyyani who briefly held power in the Yemeni inland in 999–1002, and died in 1003. After the death of al-Mansur, al-Husayn set forth his claim to the imamate, in rivalry with his distant relative ad-Da'i Yusuf. He declared himself with the title al-Mahdi. He was supported by large groups from Himyar and Hamdan. At this time, the key city San'a was governed by the Zaidi sharif al-Qasim bin al-Husayn. The sharif was expelled from the city, pursued and killed in 1012. The rival imam ad-Da'i died in the same year. With this, the power of al-Mahdi al-Husayn extended from Alhan to Sa'dah and San'a. However, in 1013, the imam was attacked by a Hamdanite force near Dhu Bin and lost his life. Like many Zaidi imams, al-Mahdi al-Husayn was a prominent author. After his demise, his brother Ja'far played a political role as emir in the Yemeni highlands for several decades. He established himself in the impenetrable stronghold Shahara and was the main opponent of the Sulayhid dynasty in the second half of the eleventh century.

== See also ==
- Imams of Yemen
- Rassids

Preceded by al-Mansur al-Qasim al-Iyyani	Zaydi Imam of Yemen contested by ad-Da'i Yusuf; 1003–1013	Succeeded by al-Mu'ayyad Ahmad
