= 1035 =

Calendar year

1035 in various calendars
- Gregorian calendar: 1035; MXXXV
- Ab urbe condita: 1788
- Armenian calendar: 484; ԹՎ ՆՁԴ
- Assyrian calendar: 5785
- Balinese saka calendar: 956–957
- Bengali calendar: 441–442
- Berber calendar: 1985
- English Regnal year: N/A
- Buddhist calendar: 1579
- Burmese calendar: 397
- Byzantine calendar: 6543–6544
- Chinese calendar: 甲戌年 (Wood Dog); 3732 or 3525 — to — 乙亥年 (Wood Pig); 3733 or 3526
- Coptic calendar: 751–752
- Discordian calendar: 2201
- Ethiopian calendar: 1027–1028
- Hebrew calendar: 4795–4796
- Hindu calendars
- Vikram Samvat: 1091–1092
- Shaka Samvat: 956–957
- Kali Yuga: 4135–4136
- Holocene calendar: 11035
- Igbo calendar: 35–36
- Iranian calendar: 413–414
- Islamic calendar: 426–427
- Japanese calendar: Chōgen 8 (長元８年)
- Javanese calendar: 938–939
- Julian calendar: 1035; MXXXV
- Korean calendar: 3368
- Minguo calendar: 877 before ROC 民前877年
- Nanakshahi calendar: −433
- Seleucid era: 1346/1347 AG
- Thai solar calendar: 1577–1578
- Tibetan calendar: ཤིང་ཕོ་ཁྱི་ལོ་ (male Wood-Dog); 1161 or 780 or 8 — to — ཤིང་མོ་ཕག་ལོ་ (female Wood-Boar); 1162 or 781 or 9

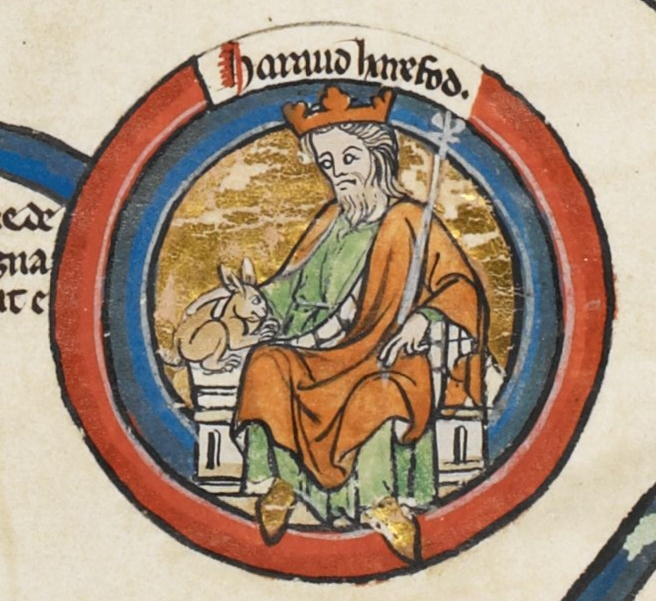
King Harold I of England (r. 1035–1040)

Year 1035 (MXXXV) was a common year starting on Wednesday of the Julian calendar.

== Events ==
=== By place ===
==== Europe ====
- March 23 – Battle of Cesar (near the village of Cesar, Portugal): The armies of Bermudo III, King of León, defeat the Moorish armies of Abu'l-Qasim, the emir of the Taifa of Seville.
- c. July 3 – 8-year-old William I becomes duke of Normandy after his father Robert I ("the Magnificent") dies on a pilgrimage at Nicaea (modern Turkey). Robert's death leads to a period of instability in Normandy, as William is too young to take his father's place. The Norman nobles in the region take the opportunity to settle old feuds and to increase their private wealth.
- October 16 – Conrad II grants the right to hold the first Freimarkt festival in Bremen. The city increases her trade with Norway, and the northern Netherlands.
- October 18 – King Sancho III of Pamplona dies and divides his dominions among his four sons, García Sánchez III, Gonzalo I, Ferdinand I and Ramiro I.
- Pisa launches a naval assault against Saracen pirate strongholds in the Lipari Islands.
- Emperor Conrad II ("the Elder") grants the city of Koper (modern Slovenia) town rights, and some degree of self-government, within the Holy Roman Empire.

==== England ====
- November 12 – King Cnut the Great dies at Shaftesbury, leaving the rule of England in dispute between his sons Harthacnut and Harold Harefoot. The earls of Northumbria and Mercia support Harold's claim, while Godwin (Earl of Wessex) supports Harthacnut. Harold is elected as regent (or joint ruler) of England. Cnut is buried in the Old Minster, in Winchester.
- Winter – Harthacnut is unable to travel to his coronation in England because his Danish kingdom is under threat of an invasion by King Magnus I of Norway and King Anund Jacob of Sweden.

== Births ==
- Dharma Pala, Indian ruler of the Pala dynasty (d. 1060)
- Richard fitz Gilbert, Norman nobleman (d. c.1090) (approximate date)
- Henry of Burgundy, French nobleman (approximate date)
- Hereward the Wake, English nobleman (approximate date)
- Hermann of Salm, German nobleman (approximate date)
- Isaac Albalia, Andalusian Jewish astronomer (d. 1094)
- Leofwine Godwinson, English nobleman (approximate date)
- Marbodius of Rennes, French archdeacon (approximate date)
- Nathan ben Jehiel, Italian Jewish lexicographer (d. 1106)
- Robert I, the Frisian, count of Flanders (approximate date)
- Urban II, pope of the Catholic Church (approximate date)

== Deaths ==
- April 13 – Herbert I of Maine, French nobleman (approximate date)
- May 26 – Berenguer Ramon I, Spanish nobleman (b. 1005)
- May 30 – Baldwin IV of Flanders ("the Bearded"), French nobleman (b. 980)
- July 3 – Robert I, Duke of Normandy ("the Magnificent"), (b. 1000) (approximate date)
- October 18 – Sancho III ("the Great"), king of Pamplona
- November 4 – Jaromír, duke of Bohemia (Přemyslid dynasty)
- November 12 – Cnut, king of Denmark, Norway and England
- Abu Ali ibn Muhammad, ruler (malik) of the Ghurid dynasty
- Astrid Olofsdotter, queen consort of Norway (House of Munsö)
- Drogo of Mantes, count of Valois and the Vexin (b. 996)
- Estrid of the Obotrites (or Astrid), queen consort of Sweden
- Guo, Chinese empress consort of Renzong (b. 1012)
- Harun, Ghaznavid governor and ruler (shah) of Khwarazm, assassinated
- Ibn al-Samh, Moorish astronomer and mathematician (b. 979)
- Svein Knutsson, king of Norway and son of Cnut the Great
- Yahya ibn Ali ibn Hammud al-Mu'tali, Hammudid caliph
