= Battle of Cesar =

Battle of the Reconquista in 1035

- Part of Reconquista
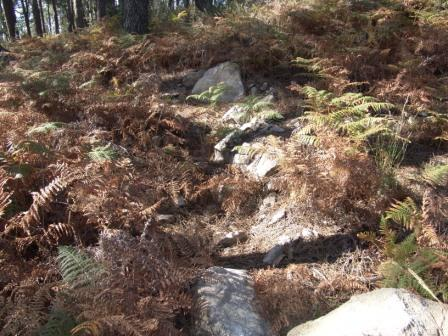
- Remains of the Castro Calbo, a Castro hillfort, near Cesar. It was in this area that the battle took place.
Date	23 March 1035
Location	Cesar, Portugal 40°55′25″N 8°26′32″W
Result	Christian victory

Belligerents
Kingdom of León; County of Portugal	Taifa of Seville

Commanders and leaders
Bermudo III	Abu'l-Qasim (POW)

Casualties and losses
Unknown	Unknown
- Location within Portugal

The Battle of Cesar, in Portuguese: Batalha de Cesar, was a battle that took place on 23 March 1035, between the armies of Bermudo III, King of León, and the Moorish armies of Abu'l-Qasim, the emir of the Taifa of Seville, near the village of Cesar, Aveiro.

The result of the battle was a defeat of the Moorish armies, which limited the warlike capacity of the Taifa of Seville in the Beiras region, increasing its loss of influence and power in the region, leading to the Beiras Campaign and the definitive conquest of Coimbra by Ferdinand I of León in 1064.

== Background ==
After Almanzor's campaigns in the late 10th and early 11th centuries, the entire region north of the Mondego had once again been subjugated and occupied by the Moors. In 985 the cities of Guimarães and Braga were sacked, and two years later, in a campaign of successive razzias against the Christian kingdoms, Almanzor captured Coimbra, Seia, Viseu and Lamego.

Subsequently, Viking and Norman raids in the region of Minho and Galicia at the beginning of the 11th century greatly weakened the warlike power of the County of Portugal and caused great political instability within it.

In 1009, after the great fragmentation of the Caliphate of Córdoba, the Taifa of Badajoz became independent, first ruled by a former slave named Sabur, and then usurped by his vizier, Abdallah ibn Al-Aftas, who founded the Aftacid dynasty. In 1023, the Taifa of Seville was also granted independence by Abu'l-Qasim. Sabur's sons fled to Lisbon, where they created the short-lived Taifa of Lisbon, which was soon reconquered by Badajoz in 1034.

Meanwhile, Gonçalo Trastamires da Maia took advantage of the internal war between Muslim taifas and retook the city of Montemor-o-Velho, lost in 1026 to Abbad I, and other strategic positions in the region. In 1034, the region between the Douro and Mondego continued to attract the attention of the Muslims of the taifa of Seville, where, at the end of that year, Abbad I organized an army to plunder the local regions.

From February 1035, he began his march to the north of Portugal. Bermudo III, who was in Galicia at the time, prepared an army to meet the Moorish army. The battle was to take place on March 23.

== Battle ==
Near the ancient Castro Calbo, in the town of Cesar, the Muslim and Christian forces commanded by Bermudo III clashed on 23 March, 1035. Bermudo III's armies were in the highest position, having the advantage of the terrain. It is presumed that the armies of Abu'l-Qasim went to meet the Leonese and Portucalese hosts, inflicting heavy casualties on the Muslim army, which retreated after the Christian charge.

The outcome of the battle was a decisive victory for Bermudo III's forces, which allowed him to annihilate Abdallah ibn Al-Aftas' expeditionary force and halt the Muslim incursion above the Mondego. According to the Crónica dos Godos, the king of the taifa of Seville himself, Abu'l-Qasim, was taken prisoner in this battle.

== Aftermath ==
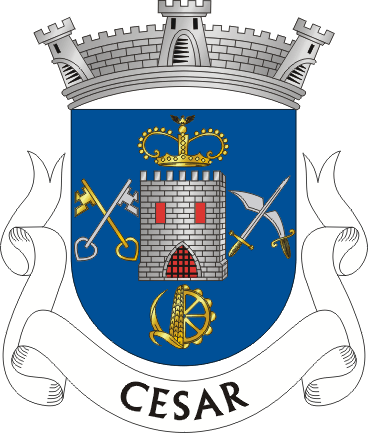
Current coat of arms of the freguesia of Cesar. The coat of arms features a sword breaking apart a Moorish sabre, referring to the Christian victory at the battle that took place there.

With the retreat of the Muslim armies from the region above the Mondego, Bermudo III planned an offensive with the nobility of Porto to retake the territories lost up to the Mondego. However, with the death of Sancho III of Pamplona on October 18, 1035, Bermudo III decided to move quickly to León, where he was immediately welcomed as King of León, and began a campaign to recover Castile from Ferdinand I of León. Without Bermudo III, the Christian offensive lost momentum and its counter-offensive failed. It was only in 1039, with the Beiras Campaign, that there was a real offensive against the Muslim Taifas, in order to retake and reconquer cities such as Lamego, Viseu, Seia and others.

== See also ==
- Reconquista
- History of Portugal
- Alhambra Decree
