= Timeline of Portuguese history (First Dynasty) =

This is a historical timeline of Portugal.

== First Dynasty: House of Borgonha ==
=== 12th century ===
- 1128, July 24 – Count Afonso Henriques defeats his mother, Theresa, Countess of Portugal, in the Battle of São Mamede and becomes sole ruler (Dux - Duke) after demands for independence from the county's people, church and nobles.
- 1129 - April 6, Afonso Henriques proclaims himself Prince of Portugal.
- 1130
  - Prince Afonso Henriques invades Galicia.
  - Prince Afonso Henriques' mother, Theresa, Countess of Portugal, dies in Galicia.
  - The Knights Hospitaller settle in Portugal.
- 1135
  - Prince Afonso Henriques conquers Leiria from the Moors.
  - King Alfonso VII of Castile and León is proclaimed Imperator totius Hispaniae. Afonso Henriques doesn't recognise King Alfonso VII new title of Emperor.
- 1137
  - Battle of Arcos de Valdevez
  - Peace treaty of Tui, whereby Prince Afonso Henriques acknowledges himself as vassal to King Alfonso VII of Castile and León, through the possession of Astorga. Prince Afonso Henriques would never keep his acknowledgement of vassal to King Alfonso VII.
  - The Moors retake Leiria.
- 1139
  - July 25, Independence of Portugal from the Kingdom of León declared after the Battle of Ourique against the Almoravids led by Ali ibn Yusuf: Prince Afonso Henriques becomes Afonso I, King of Portugal.
  - King Afonso I of Portugal retakes Leiria from the Moors.
- 1140
  - The Knights Hospitaller receive lands and privileges from King Afonso I of Portugal.
  - Portuguese victory in Arcos de Valdevez against Leonese and Castilian forces.
  - King Afonso I of Portugal tries and fails to conquer Lisbon from the Moors.
  - The Moors retake Leiria.
- 1142
  - King Afonso I of Portugal retakes Leiria from the Moors and the town receives its foral (compilation of feudal rights) to stimulate the colonisation of the area.
  - Siege of Lisbon (1142): A group of Anglo-Norman crusaders aid King Afonso I Henriques attempt to conquer Lisbon. However, the combined forces are insufficient and the siege failed.
- 1143
  - Treaty of Zamora: Alfonso VII of León and Castille recognizes the Kingdom of Portugal in the presence of King Afonso I of Portugal, witnessed by the papal representative, the Cardinal Guido de Vico, at the Cathedral of Zamora. Both kings promise durable peace between their kingdoms.
  - King Afonso I of Portugal declares himself vassal to Pope Innocent II, placing the Kingdom of Portugal and himself under the protection of Saint Peter and the Holy See.
- 1144
  - The Muridun ("Disciples") under Abul-Qasim Ahmad ibn al-Husayn al-Qasi rebel in the Algarve. Ibn al-Mundhir takes Silves in his name and the governor of Beja, Sidray ibn Wazir, also supports him. Ibn al-Mundhir and Sidray ibn Wazir kill the garrison of Monchique castle, and 70 men take Mértola by surprise (12 Aug). Soon after the Andalusian governor of Niebla, Yusuf ibn Ahmad al-Bitruji declares for the Muridun. The Almoravid Yahya ibn Ali ibn Ghaniya drives the Muridun back from Seville, and subsequently Sidray ibn Wazir splits off from the other Muridun.
  - The Taifas of Mértola and of Silves again become independent.
  - The Order of Cistercians installs itself in Portugal, at Tarouca
- 1145 - The Taifa of Badajoz again becomes independent and conquers the Taifa of Mértola.
- 1146
  - The Taifa of Mértola gains independence from Badajoz.
  - King Afonso I of Portugal marries Maud of Savoy, daughter of Amadeus III, Count of Savoy and Maurienne.
- 1147
  - March, King Afonso I of Portugal takes the Taifa of Santarém in a surprise attack.
  - May 19, A fleet of almost 200 ships of crusaders (Second Crusade) leaves from Dartmouth in England, consisting of Flemish, Frisian, Norman, English, Scottish, and some German crusaders. The fleet was commanded by Arnold III of Aerschot (nephew of Godfrey of Louvain) Christian of Ghistelles, Henry Glanville (constable of Suffolk), Simon of Dover, Andrew of London, and Saher of Archelle.
  - June 16, The crusaders fleet arrives at the northern city of Porto, and are convinced by the bishop, Pedro II Pitões, to continue to Lisbon.
  - July 1, The Siege of Lisbon begins, after the armies of King Afonso I of Portugal were joined by the crusaders.
  - October 21, The Moorish rulers of Lisbon agree to surrender to King Afonso I of Portugal, basically due to the hunger that was felt inside the city walls. The terms of surrender indicated that the Muslim garrison of the city would be allowed to flee.
  - October 25, The city of Lisbon opens its doors to the Christian armies. As soon as the Christians enter the city the terms of surrender were broken. Many Muslims were killed, and the city was thoroughly plundered before King Afonso I of Portugal finally was able to stop the onslaught.
  - The towns of Almada and Palmela, just south of Lisbon, are taken from the Moors.
  - King Afonso I of Portugal orders the construction of the church and monastery of Church of São Vicente de Fora (St. Vincent outside the Walls), in Lisbon, in honour of St. Vincent the Deacon.
- 1148
  - 11 January 1148 - Gonçalo Mendes da Maia captures Óbidos.
  - Some of the crusaders that had helped King Afonso I of Portugal conquer Lisbon settle in the newly captured city, and Gilbert of Hastings is elected bishop of the renovated Diocese of Lisbon, but most of the crusaders' fleet continues to the east. Some unsuccessfully besiege Faro.
- 1149 - A new Berber dynasty, the Almohad, led by Emir Abd al-Mu'min al-Kumi conquers North Africa to the Almoravids and soon invades the Iberian Peninsula.
- 1150 - The Taifas of Badajoz and of Beja and Évora are taken by the Almohads.
- 1151
  - King Afonso I of Portugal tries and fails to take Alcácer do Sal from the Moors.
  - The Taifa of Mértola is taken by the Almohads.
- 1152 - The Cistercians build the Monastery of St. John in Tarouca
- 1153 - The Cistercians build the Monastery of Alcobaça.
- 1155 - The Taifa of Silves is taken by the Almohads.
- 1154
  - King Afonso tries to take Alcácer do Sal a second time, unsuccessfully.
  - Sancho, son of King Afonso I of Portugal and future King of Portugal is born.
- 1157
  - Third attack on Alcácer do Sal with the support of a crusader fleet commanded by the count of Flanders Thierry of Alsace
- 1158 - King Afonso I of Portugal conquers Alcácer do Sal from the Moors.
- 1159
  - The Castle of Cera (in Tomar) is donated to the Knights Templar.
  - Évora and Beja, in the southern province of Alentejo, are taken from the Moors.
- 1160
  - April - Beja was abandoned.
  - The city of Tomar is founded by Gualdim Pais.
- 1161 - Évora, Beja and Alcácer do Sal are retaken by the Moors.
- 1162 - King Afonso I of Portugal retakes Beja from the Moors.
- 1163 - The Almohad Caliph Abd al-Mu'min al-Kumi dies and is succeeded by Abu Ya'qub Yusuf I.
- 1165
  - Sesimbra and Palmela were taken.
  - The Portuguese armies, led by Geraldo the Fearless, retake Évora from the Moors.
  - Negotiations between Portugal and León result in the marriage of Princess Urraca of Portugal, King Afonso I's daughter, with King Ferdinand II of León.
- 1166
  - The Order of Calatrava settles in Portugal, at Évora.
  - The Portuguese armies take Serpa and Moura (in Alentejo) from the Moors.
- 1168 - Portuguese frontiersman Geraldo the Fearless goes into the territory of Badajoz.
- 1169
  - King Afonso I of Portugal grants the Knights Templar one third of all they conquer to the Moors in Alentejo.
  - Geraldo the Fearless attacks Badajoz.
  - King Afonso I of Portugal is wounded by a fall from his horse in Badajoz, and is captured by the competing forces of King Ferdinand II of León. As ransom King Afonso I was obliged to surrender almost all the conquests he had made in Galicia in the previous years as well as Badajoz, that the Leonese gave back to the Almohads as a vassal territory.
- 1170
  - The Almohads transfer their capital to Seville.
  - April - Almohad attack on Beja.
  - 15 August - Prince Sancho is knighted at Santa Cruz in Coimbra.
  - September - Second siege of Badajoz.
- 1172
  - The Order of Santiago settles in Portugal.
- 1174 – The kingdom of Aragon recognizes Portugal as independent.
- 1175 - Beja recaptured by Almohads.
- 1176 - Coruche is granted to the Order of Calatrava.
- 1178 - Prince Sancho leads a great raid into Muslim territory that reaches Seville.
- 1179
  - Pope Alexander III, in the Papal bull Manifestis Probatum, recognizes Afonso I as King and Portugal as an independent country with the right to conquer lands from the Moors. With this papal blessing, Portugal was at last secured as a country and safe from any Leonese or Castilian attempts of annexation.
  - King Ferdinand II of León repudiates his wife, Urraca of Portugal, King Afonso I's daughter.
  - The Almohads attack Abrantes.
  - An Almohad fleet attacks Lisbon.
- 1180
  - July 15 - An Almohad fleet is defeated by Fuas Roupinho at the Battle of Cape Espichel.
  - The Almohads siege Évora.
- 1181
  - The Almohads raise the siege of Évora.
  - A Portuguese fleet commanded by Fuas Roupinho is defeated by an Almohad fleet of 51 galleys.
- 1184
  - The Portuguese defeat the Almohads at Santarém.
  - Yusuf I, Almohad Caliph, dies and is succeeded by Abu Yusuf Ya'qub al-Mansur.
- 1185
  - December 6, King Afonso I of Portugal dies.
  - Sancho I of Portugal becomes King of Portugal.
- 1185-1212 - Sancho I of Portugal founds several new towns and villages and takes great care in populating remote areas in the northern Christian regions of Portugal, notably with Flemings and Burgundians.
- 1189 - Sancho captures Silves.
- 1190 - The Almohads siege Tomar.
- 1191 - The Almohads recapture Silves, Beja, Alcácer do Sal, Palmela, Coina, Almada and all territory south of the Tagus.
- 1193 - Mafra was granted to the Order of Calatrava.
- 1194 - King Sancho grants the Hospitallers the lands of Guidintesta, where the Castle of Belver was later built.
- 1195 - Battle of Alarcos, in which the Portuguese participated.
- 1199
  - The Almohad Caliph Abu Yusuf Ya'qub al-Mansur dies and is succeeded by Muhammad an-Nasir.
  - Guarda was founded.
  - King Sancho donated to the Templars the lands of Açafa, where Castelo Branco was later founded.

=== 13th century ===
- 1200
  - The Order of Calatrava founds Benavente.
- 1202 - Severe hunger afflicted Portugal as most of Europe.
- 1205 - Idanha-a-Nova was founded by the Templars.
- 1211 - King Sancho granted Avis to the Order of Calatrava.
- 1212
  - Afonso II of Portugal becomes king.
  - Culmination of the Reconquista. Christians, amongst them King Afonso II of Portugal, defeat Almohads (Caliph Muhammad an-Nasir) at the Battle of Las Navas de Tolosa. The Christians had 60-100,000 infantry and 10,000 cavalry, and had troops from Western Europe, Castile, Navarre, Aragon, León and Portugal, Military Orders (Knights Templar, Knights Hospitaller, Santiago, Cavatrava), and urban Militias.
- 1213 - Abu Ya'qub Yusuf II becomes Almohad Caliph.
- 1217 - Siege of Alcácer do Sal: The town of Alcácer do Sal is conquered from the Almohads.
- 1226 - Unsuccessful Portuguese attack on Elvas.
- 1229 - Elvas and Juromenha were captured.
- 1232
  - Moura and Serpa were recaptured by the Hospitallers.
  - Castelo de Vide and Crato were founded by the Hospitallers.
- 1233 – Sancho II of Portugal becomes king.
- 1234 - Aljustrel was captured by the Knights of Santiago.
- 1238 - Portugal captures most of the Algarve.
- 1246 – Pope Innocent IV declares Sancho II an heretic and orders his removal of the throne.
- 1247 – Afonso III of Portugal becomes king; Sancho II is exiled to Toledo.
- 1249 – Afonso III conquers Faro, Loulé, Albufeira, Porches and Aljezur from the Moors, thus removing all Muslim communities from Portuguese soil and ending the Portuguese Reconquista.
- 1254 – First official reunion of the Cortes, the kingdom's general assembly.
- 1255 - The city of Lisbon becomes the capital-city of Portugal.
- 1267 - The Treaty of Badajoz was signed.
- 1276 – John XXI becomes the first and only Portuguese Pope (died 1277).
- 1279 – Dinis of Portugal becomes king.
- 1297 – Dinis signs a treaty with Ferdinand IV of Castile to define the borders between Portugal and Castile.

=== 14th century ===
- 1308 – First Portuguese commercial treaty, signed with England.
- 1325 – Afonso IV of Portugal becomes king.
- 1341 - Portugal raids the Canary Islands.
- 1355 – Inês de Castro is killed by royal order; begins civil war between Afonso IV and his heir Pedro.
- 1357 – Pedro I of Portugal becomes king; Inês de Castro is removed from her grave and crowned Queen of Portugal.
- 1367 – Fernando I of Portugal becomes king.
- 1383/1385 – Civil war and political anarchy: 1383-1385 Crisis.

== See also ==
- Timeline of Portuguese history
  - Second County of Portugal (11th to 12th century)
  - Second Dynasty: Aviz (14th to 16th century)
