= Taifa of Lisbon =

Medieval emirate in Portugal

Coordinates: 38.7223°N 9.1393°W

Taifa of Lisbon طائفة الأشبونة
- 1022–1025
- Capital: Lisbon
- Common languages: Arabic, Mozarabic, Hebrew, Berber
- Religion: Sunni Islam (official), Christianity (Roman Catholic), Judaism
- Government: Monarchy
- Historical era: Middle Ages
  - Downfall of Caliphate of Córdoba: 1022
  - Disestablished: 1025
- Currency: Dirham and Dinar
Preceded by	Succeeded by
Caliphate of Córdoba	Taifa of Badajoz
- Today part of: Portugal

The Taifa of Lisbon (from Andalusian Arabic: طائفة الأشبونة, romanized: Ṭāʾifat al-Ushbūna) was a medieval Islamic Arab Taifa kingdom of the Gharb al-Andalus or Western al-Andalus. It was located in the Lower March, the northwestern section of Al-Andalus, and it was ruled by the Banu Khazraj.

The taifa encompassed the Lisbon region of what is now Portugal.

== List of Emirs of the Taifa of Lisbon ==
=== Banu Sabur dynasty ===
- Abd al-Aziz ibn Sabur
- Abd al-Malik ibn Sabur

The Saburs were a subgroup of the Arabian tribe of Banu Khazraj.

== History ==
After the death of taifa of Badajoz king Sabur al-Saqlabi in 1022, his vizier Abdallah ibn Al-Aftas seized power. Sabur's two sons, Abd al-Aziz ibn Sabur and Abd al-Malik ibn Sabur, fled to Lisbon, where they established the small and short-lived taifa of Lisbon. Abd al-Aziz died shortly afterward. Abd al-Malik was deposed when the Lisbon elite went behind his back to negotiate a peaceful reintegration with Badajoz. Abd al-Malik was allowed to leave Lisbon and resettled in Córdoba. Portuguese medievalist António Rei estimates that the reunification with Badajoz occurred in 1025 because in that year, Lisbon was attacked by the taifa of Seville, an enemy of Badajoz. Abdallah ibn Al-Aftas also took the honorific laqab al-Mansur (the victorious) in 1025, which Rei suggests coincided with the restoration of the entire original taifa territory, including Lisbon.

== See also ==
- Taifas in Portugal
- List of Sunni Muslim dynasties
- Portugal in the Reconquista
