= Timeline of Portuguese history (Second County) =

This is a historical timeline of Portugal.

== Second County of Portugal ==
=== 11th century ===
- 1077 - Alfonso VI of León and Castile proclaims himself Emperor of all Spains.
- 1080
  - Coimbra is again a diocese.
  - Count Sisnando Davides of Coimbra takes part in the invasion of Granada.
- 1085-1096 - The Order of Cluny is established in Portugal.
- 1086
  - Several Muslim Emirs (namely Abbad III al-Mu'tamid) ask the Almoravids leader Yusuf ibn Tashfin for help against Alfonso VI of León and Castile. In this year Yusuf ibn Tashfin passed the straits to Algeciras and inflicted a severe defeat on the Christians at the Battle of az-Zallaqah (North of Badajoz). He was debarred from following up his victory by trouble in North Africa which he had to settle in person.
  - Raymond of Burgundy, son of William I, Count of Burgundy, comes to Iberia for the 1st time to fight against the Moors, bringing with him his younger cousin Henry of Burgundy, grandson of Robert I, Duke of Burgundy.
- 1090
  - Almoravid Yusuf ibn Tashfin return to Iberia and conquers all the Taifas.
  - Raymond of Burgundy and Henry of Burgundy come to Iberia for the 2nd time.
- 1091
  - Count Sisnando Davides of Coimbra dies.
  - Alfonso VI of León and Castile gives his daughter Urraca of Castile in marriage to Raymond of Burgundy together with the fiefdom of Galicia.
  - The Taifa of Mértola falls to the Almoravids.
- 1094
  - Alfonso VI of León and Castile grants Raymond of Burgundy the government of Portugal and Coimbra.
  - Henry of Burgundy marries Alfonso VI of León and Castile's illegitimate daughter Teresa of León.
  - Almoravid Sir ibn Abi Bakr takes Badajoz and Lisbon. Fall of the Taifa of Badajoz.
- 1096
  - Raymond of Burgundy and Henry of Burgundy sign a treaty whereby Henry promises to recognize Raymond as king upon the death of Alfonso VI of Castile, receiving in exchange the Kingdom of Toledo or of Portugal.
- 1096
  - Establishment of the 2nd County of Portugal (Condado Portucalense), by Count Henry of Burgundy.
  - The Almoravids take Santarém.
- 1097 - Yusuf ibn Tashfin assumes the title of Amir al Muslimin (Prince of the Muslims).

=== 12th century ===
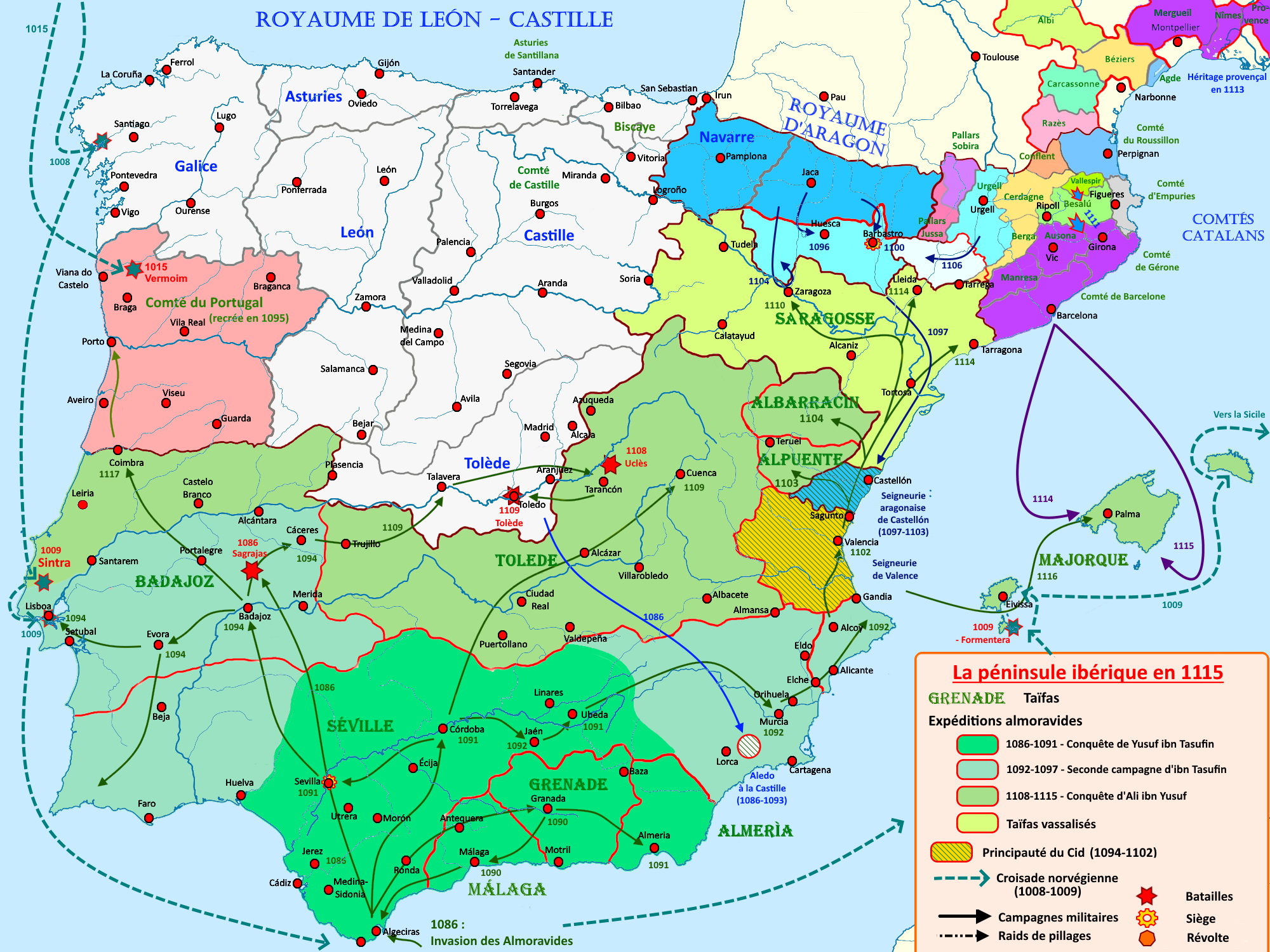
Iberian Peninsula around 1115, Second County of Portugal show in pale red.

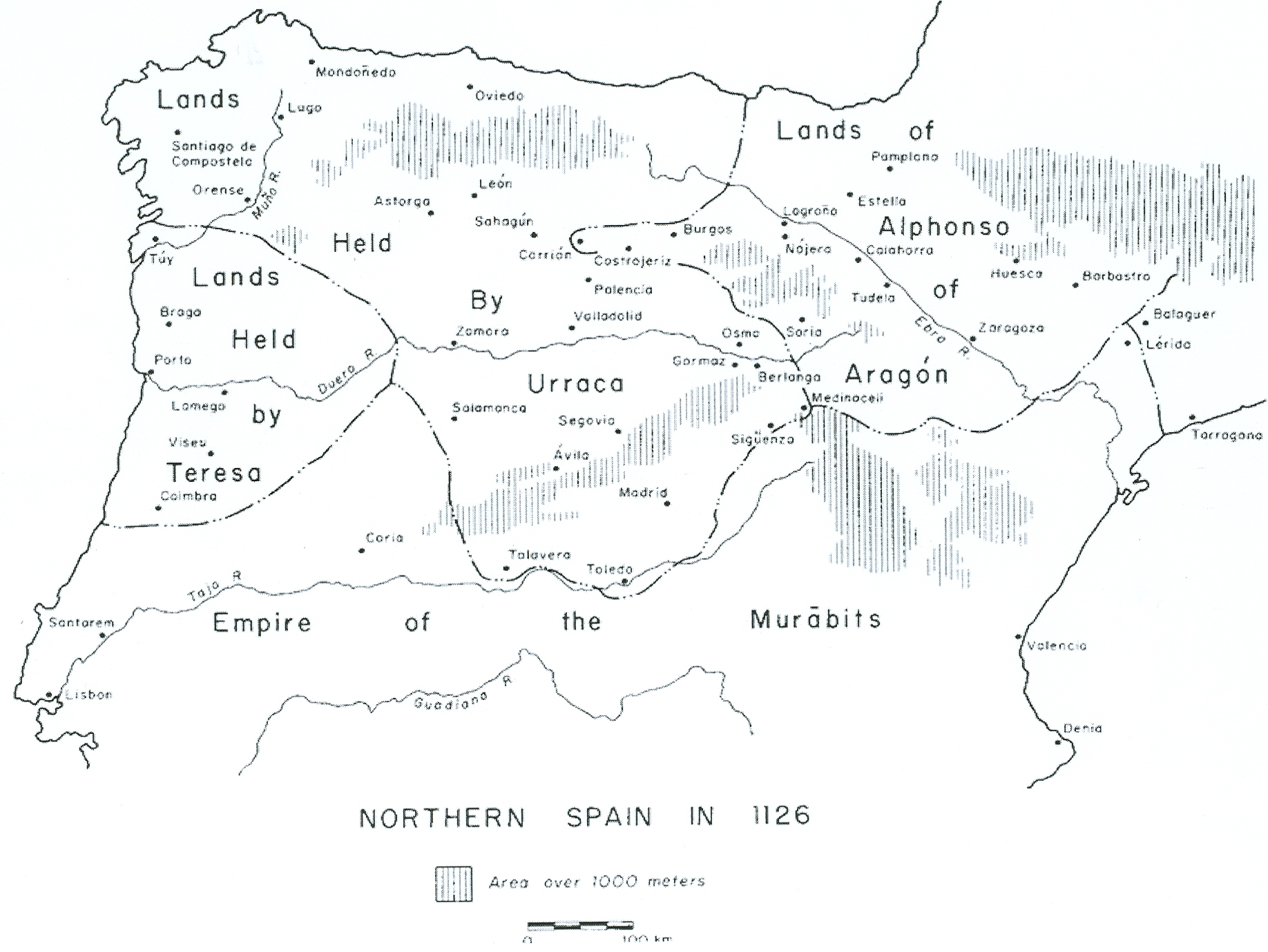
Political map of the north part of the Iberian Peninsula in the year 1126

- 1102 - Diego Gemírez, Bishop of Santiago de Compostela, uses force to carry off the relics of St. Victor and St. Fructuosus of Dumes from Braga - recently reinstated as a Metropolitan See.
- 1103 - In the absence of Henry, Count of Portugal in Rome or Jerusalem, Theresa, Countess of Portugal, aided by Soeiro Mendes, governs Portugal.
- 1105 - The Almohads, founded by Ibn Tumart, began as a religious movement to rid Islam of impurities. Most specifically, the Almohades were opposed to anthropomorphisms which had slipped into Iberian Islam. Ibn Tumart's successor, Abd al-Mu'min, turned the movement against non-Muslims, specifically Jews and Christians. Sweeping across North Africa and into Muslim Iberia, the Almohads initiate riots and persecutions of both Muslims and non-Muslims. In some towns Jews and Christians are given the choice of conversion, exile, or death.
- 1107 - Count Raymond of Burgundy dies. The Kingdom of Galicia passes on to his son Alfonso Raimúndez.
- 1109
  - July 1 – Alfonso VI of Castile and León dies. Urraca of Castile, Count Raymond of Burgundy's widow, is his only surviving legitimate child and marries King Alfonso I of Aragon.
  - July 25 – Afonso Henriques, son of Henry, Count of Portugal, is born in the city of Guimarães.
- 1110
  - Henry, Count of Portugal unsuccessfully besieges King Alfonso I of Aragon in Penafiel.
  - Urraca of Castile distances herself from her husband Alfonso I of Aragon accusing him of being abusive and infertile.
  - Henry, Count of Portugal makes common party with Alfonso I of Aragon against Urraca of Castile.
- 1111
  - Almoravids led by Sir ibn Abi Bakr occupy Lisbon and Santarém in the west . These cities were occupied by the Almoravids in 1094-95 this suggests a fluctuating border in Portugal.
  - Conference of Palencia, where Urraca of Castile divides her estates with Henry, Count of Portugal and his wife and her sister Theresa.
  - Urraca of Castile makes peace with her husband Alfonso I of Aragon, even though they remain separated.
  - Henry, Count of Portugal, believing Urraca of Castile has betrayed him, besieges her and her husband Alfonso I of Aragon in Sahagún, aided by Urraca's son Alfonso Raimúndez.
  - Henry, Count of Portugal grants city rights and privileges to Coimbra and captures Santarém from the Moors.
  - Alfonso Raimúndez, Raymond of Burgundy and Urraca of Castile's son, is proclaimed King of Castile and León as Alfonso VII. This is not recognized.
- 1112 - Henry, Count of Portugal dies. His son Afonso Henriques inherits the County of Portugal, but, being too young, it's his mother, Theresa, Countess of Portugal, that governs the county after her husband's death with the title of Regina (Queen). Santarém recaptured by the Moors.
- 1114
  - The marriage between Urraca of Castile and Alfonso I of Aragon is annulled.
  - The Taifa of Beja and Évora becomes independent.
- 1116 - The armies of Theresa, Countess of Portugal battle against the armies of Urraca of Castile.
- 1117 - Almoravids under Emir Ali ibn Yusuf himself take Coimbra, but abandon the city after a few days.
- 1120
  - Afonso Henriques takes sides with the Bishop of Braga against his mother Theresa, Countess of Portugal and her lover, the Count Fernando Peres de Trava of Galicia
  - The armies of Theresa, Countess of Portugal battle against the armies of Urraca of Castile.
- 1121 - Alfonso Raimúndez comes into Portugal in a mission of sovereignty with his mother Urraca of Castile. Their armies capture Theresa, Countess of Portugal at Lanhoso, that accepts to go free and hold the County of Portugal as a fief of the Kingdom of León.
- 1122 - Afonso Henriques, aged 14, makes himself a Knight on his own account in the Cathedral of Zamora.
- 1126 - Urraca of Castile dies. Her son Alfonso Raimúndez finally becomes King Alfonso VII of Castile and León.
- 1127
  - Theresa, Countess of Portugal donates Vimieiro to the Order of Cluny
  - The Kingdom of León invades Portugal and besieges Guimarães. The Portuguese Knight Egas Moniz de Ribadouro manages to make King Alfonso VII of Castile and León accept promises' of Portuguese fealty.
- 1128
  - Theresa, Countess of Portugal donates Soure to the Knights Templar.
  - July 24, Count Afonso Henriques defeats his mother, Theresa, Countess of Portugal, in the Battle of São Mamede (near Guimarães) and becomes sole ruler (Dux - Duke) after demands for independence from the county's people, church and nobles.

== See also ==
- Timeline of Portuguese history
  - First County of Portugal (9th to 11th century)
  - First Dynasty: Burgundy (12th to 14th century)
