= Archaeological Museum of Badajoz =

Coordinates: 38.8822°N 6.9683°W

- Museo Arqueológico de Badajoz
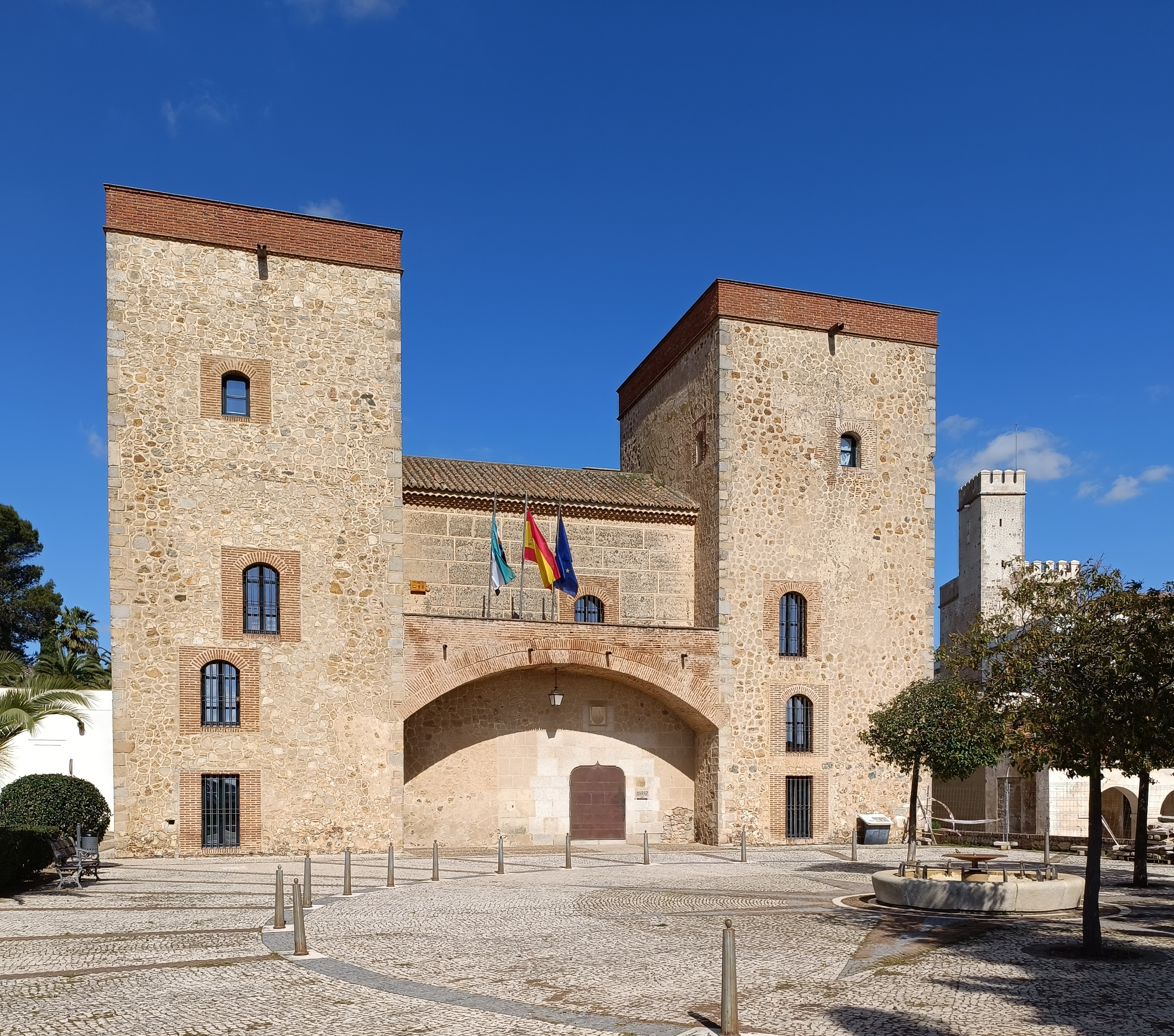
- Established: 1867
- Location: Badajoz, Spain
- Type: Archaeology museum
- Owner: General State Administration

The Provincial Archaeological Museum of Badajoz (Spanish: Museo Arqueológico Provincial de Badajoz) or simply the Archaeological Museum of Badajoz is an archaeology museum located in Badajoz, Spain. Owned by the Spanish State, its management has been transferred to the Junta of Extremadura.

== History ==
Despite an earlier unmaterialised project for a museum dated from 1844, the institution was created like many of the Spanish provincial museums in 1867, in this case as a re-foundation of the "Comisión Provincial de Monumentos", yet it did not however take its true form until 1869, when the museum received a number of artifacts from the excavations at Los Cercos. Until then, the reduced collection had been displayed at the plenary hall of the provincial deputation.

The ownership of the museum was passed from the provincial deputation of Badajoz to the directorate of State Museums in 1938, during the Spanish Civil War.

Following a number of moves along history, the museum opened at its current premises at the Palacio de los Condes de la Roca (within the walled bounds of the Alcazaba of Badajoz) in 1989. Also in that year, the transfer of the museum's management (not the ownership) to the Junta of Extremadura was sealed by means of an agreement signed by the Ministry of Education, Culture and Sport and the autonomous community of Extremadura.

== Collection ==
The museum hosts an extensive collection of warrior steles from the Final Bronze Age, comprising about a quarter of all found in the Iberian Peninsula. Besides from Badajoz proper, the museum's collection of tiles comes from Toledo, Medellín, Zalamea de la Serena, Cumbres Mayores, Granada and Calera de León.

The topic areas of the permanent exhibition halls are listed as follows: Physical Environment, Prehistory, Protohistory, Roma, Late Roman, Visigothic, Islam, Christian Middle Ages.

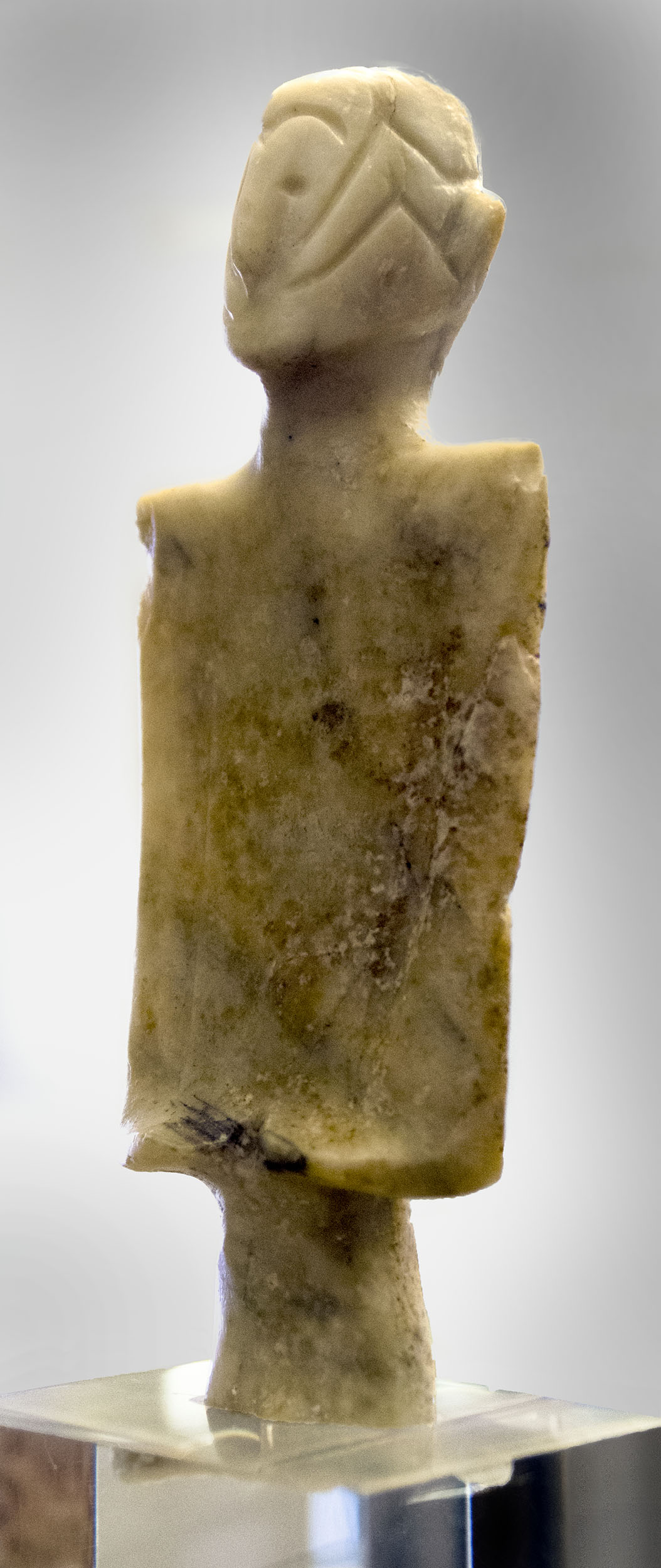
Anthropomorphic figurine from Rena (c. 3rd millennium BC)

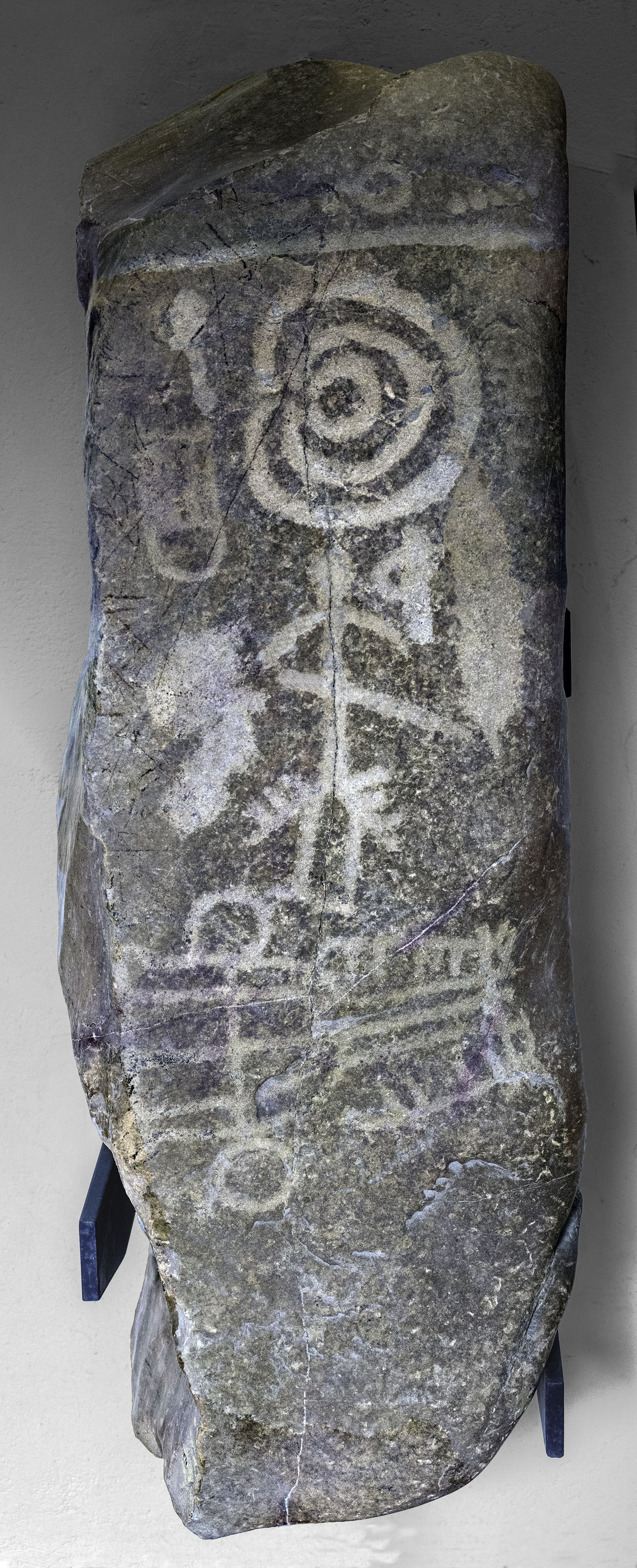
Warrior stele from Los Llanos, Zarza Capilla

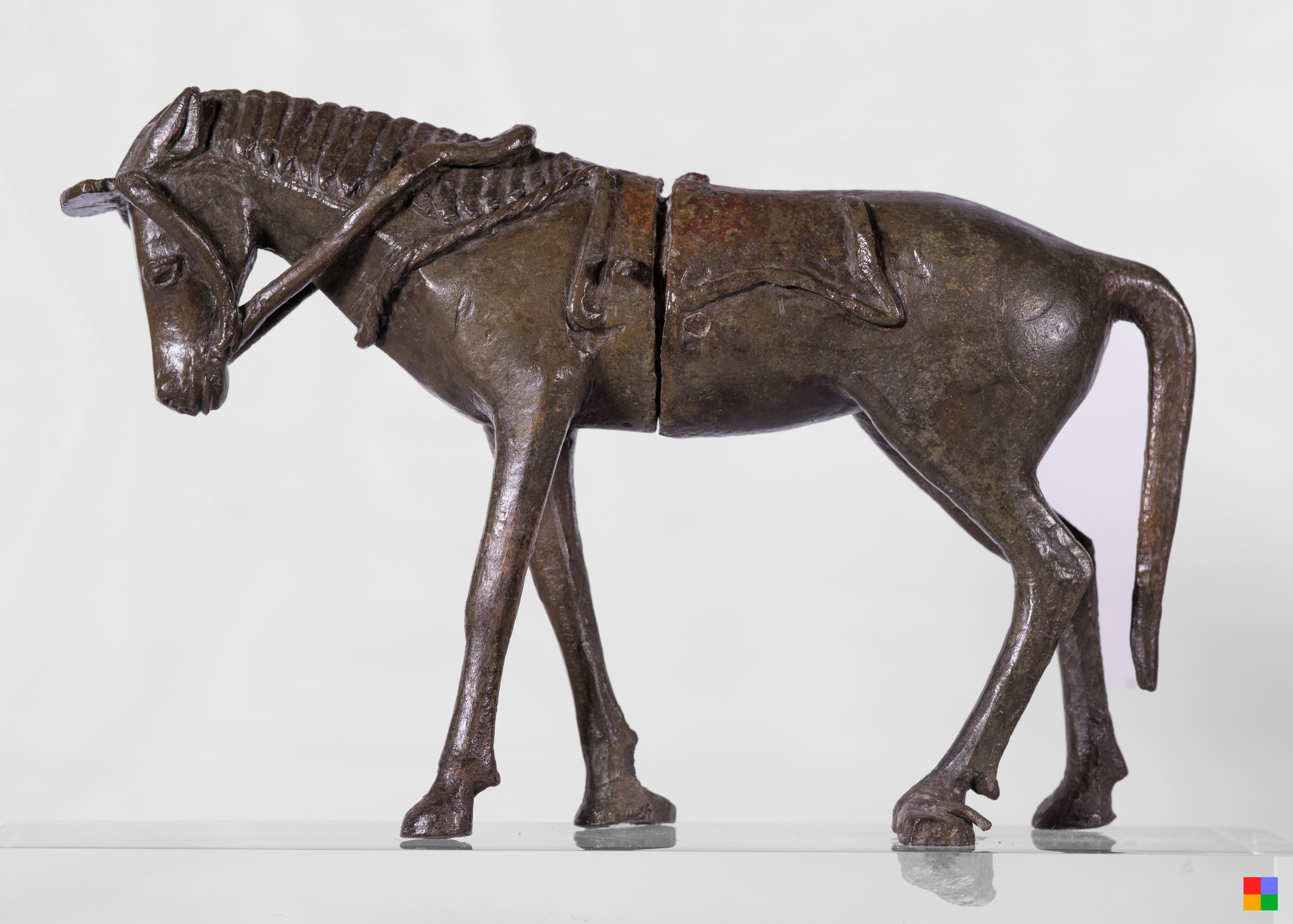
Bronze horse from Cancho Roano (c. 5th century BC)

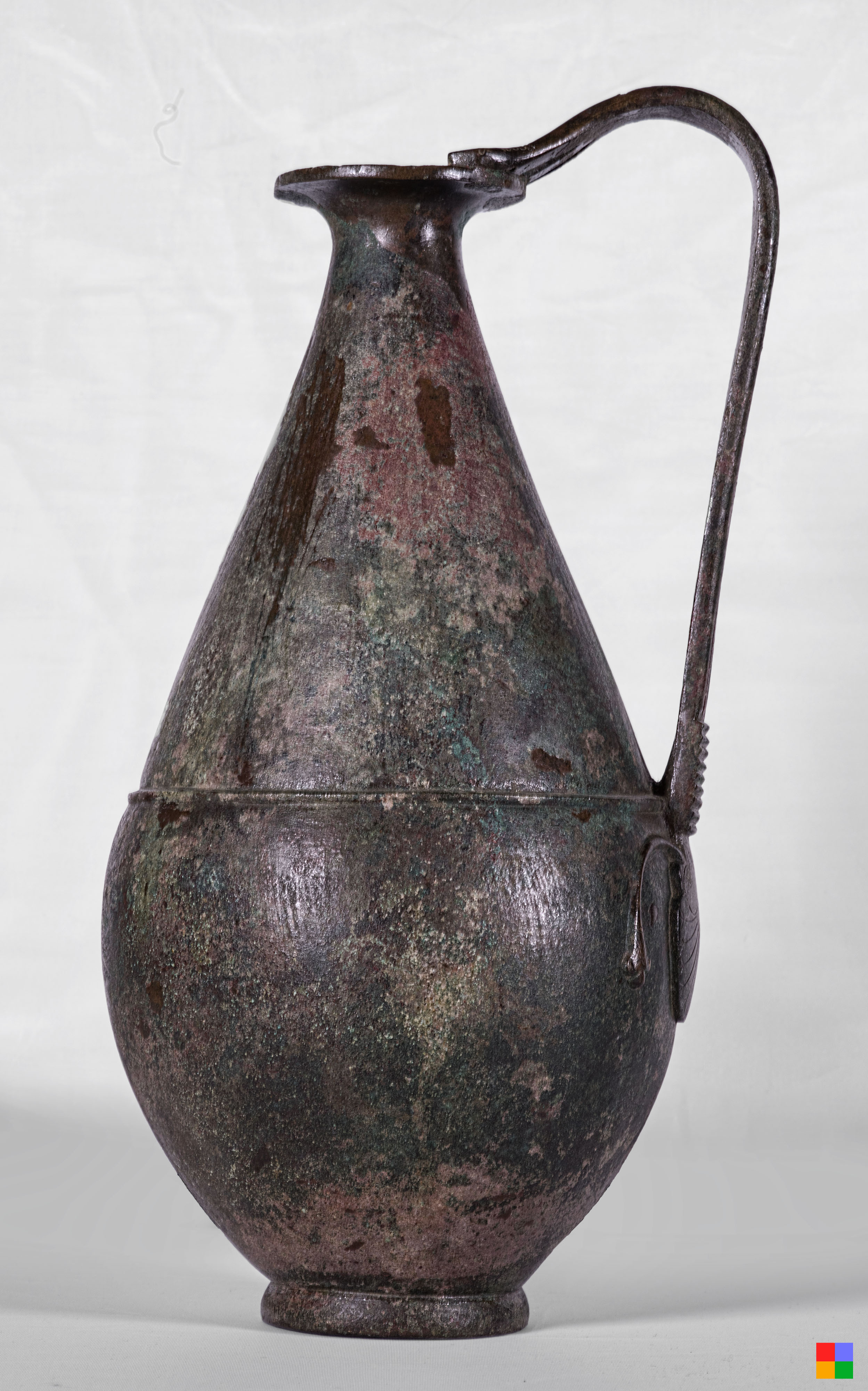
Punic-Tartessian vessel from Siruela

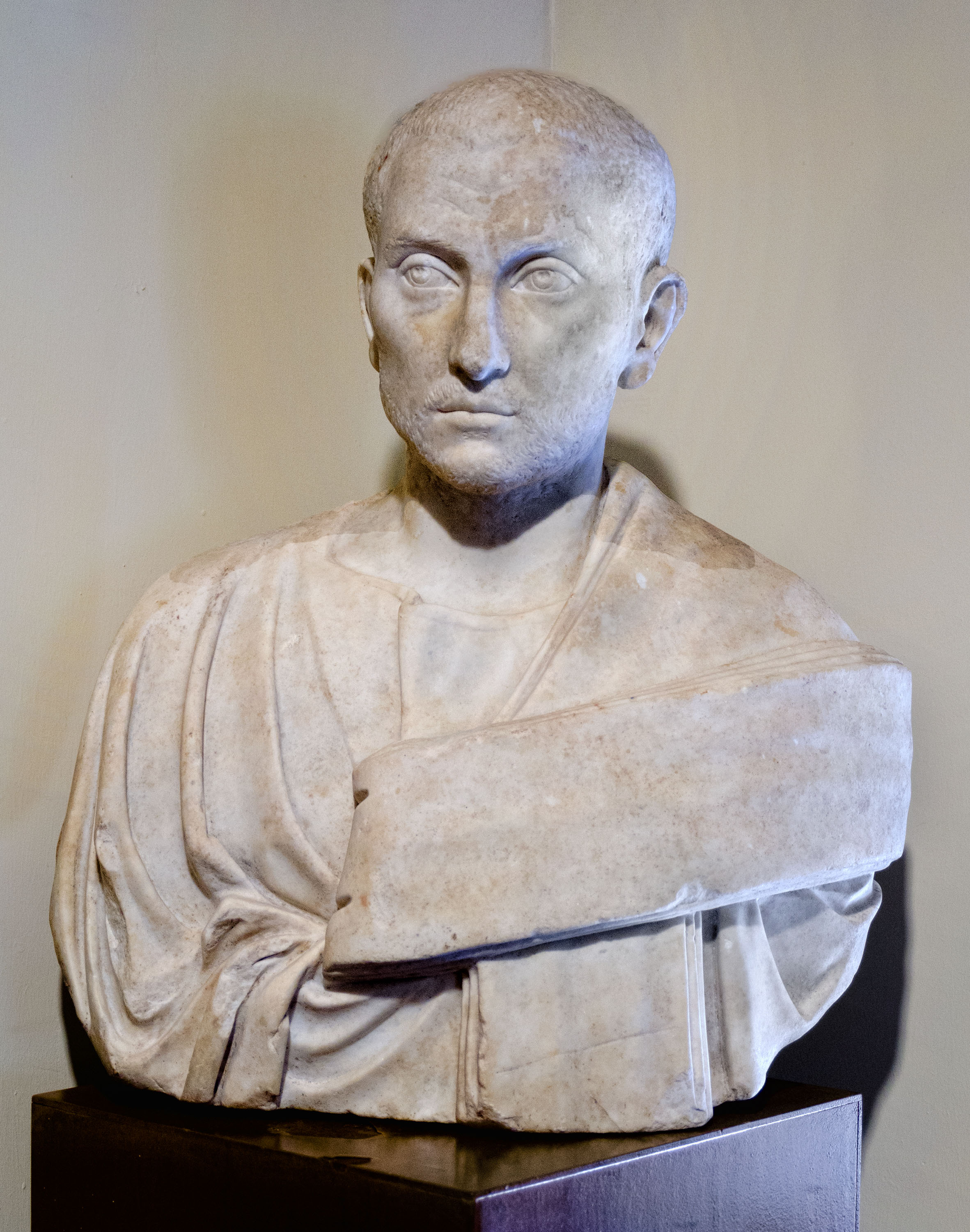
Unidentified Roman bust found in La Majona, Don Benito

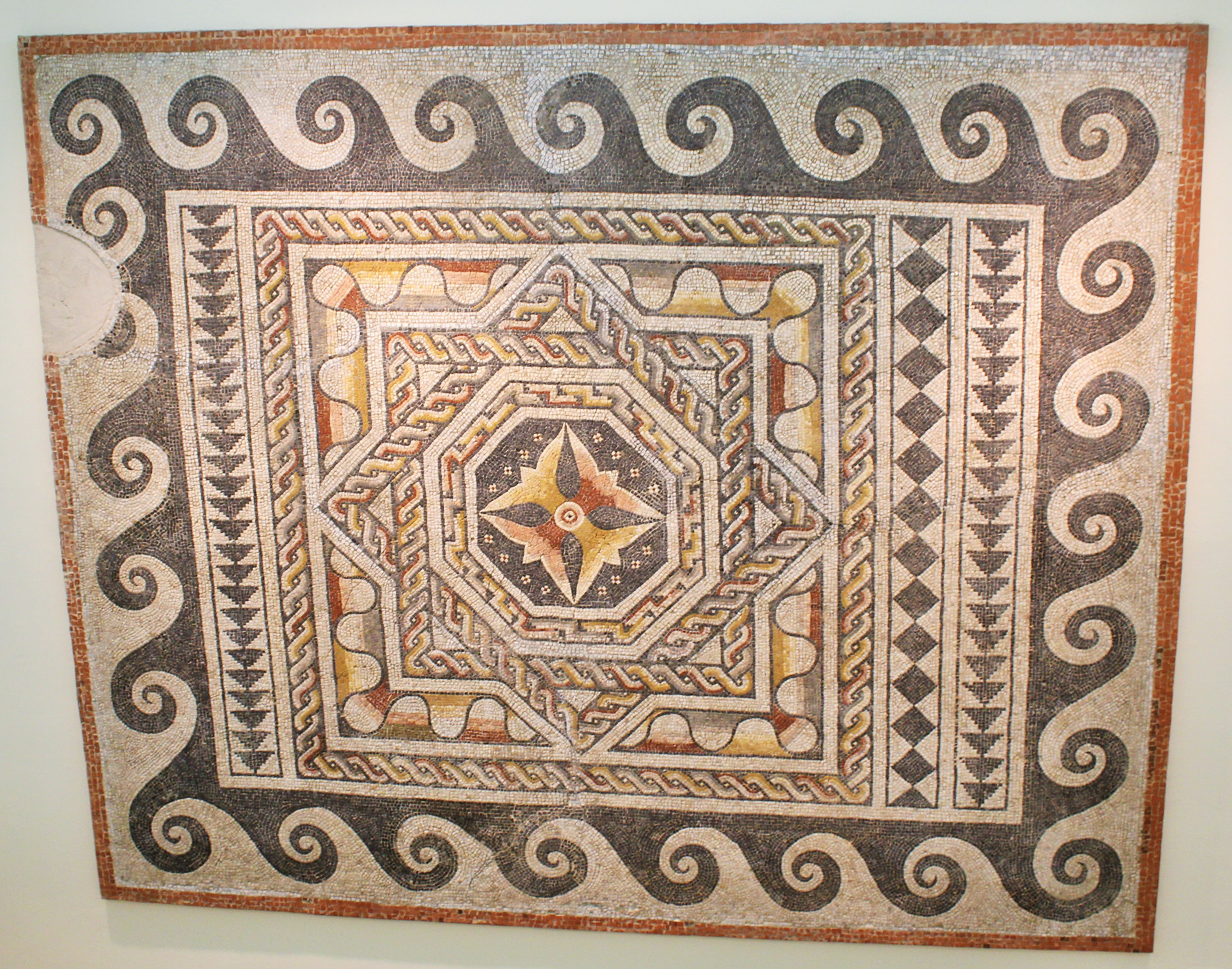
Roman mosaic

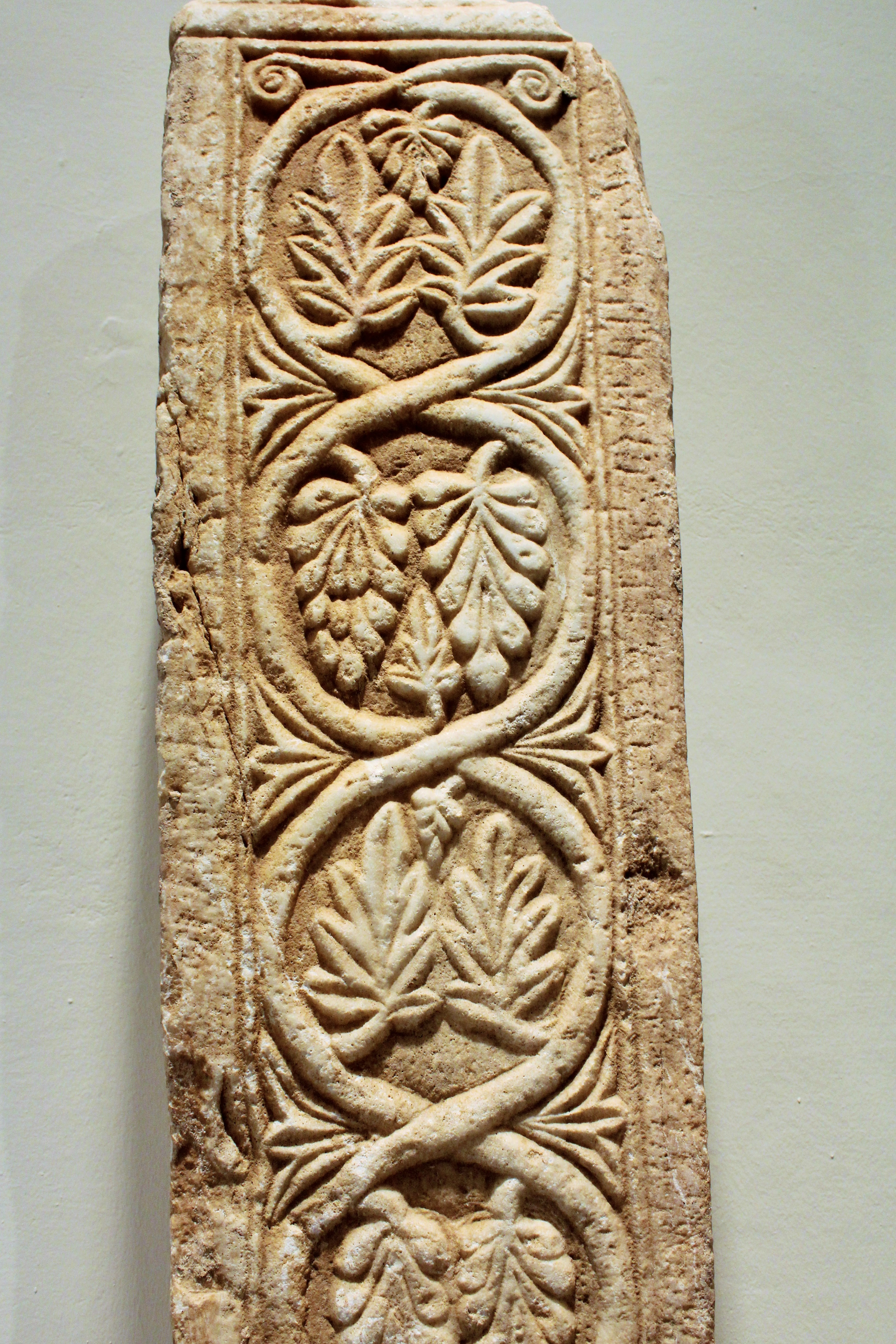
Visigothic pilaster from the alcazaba

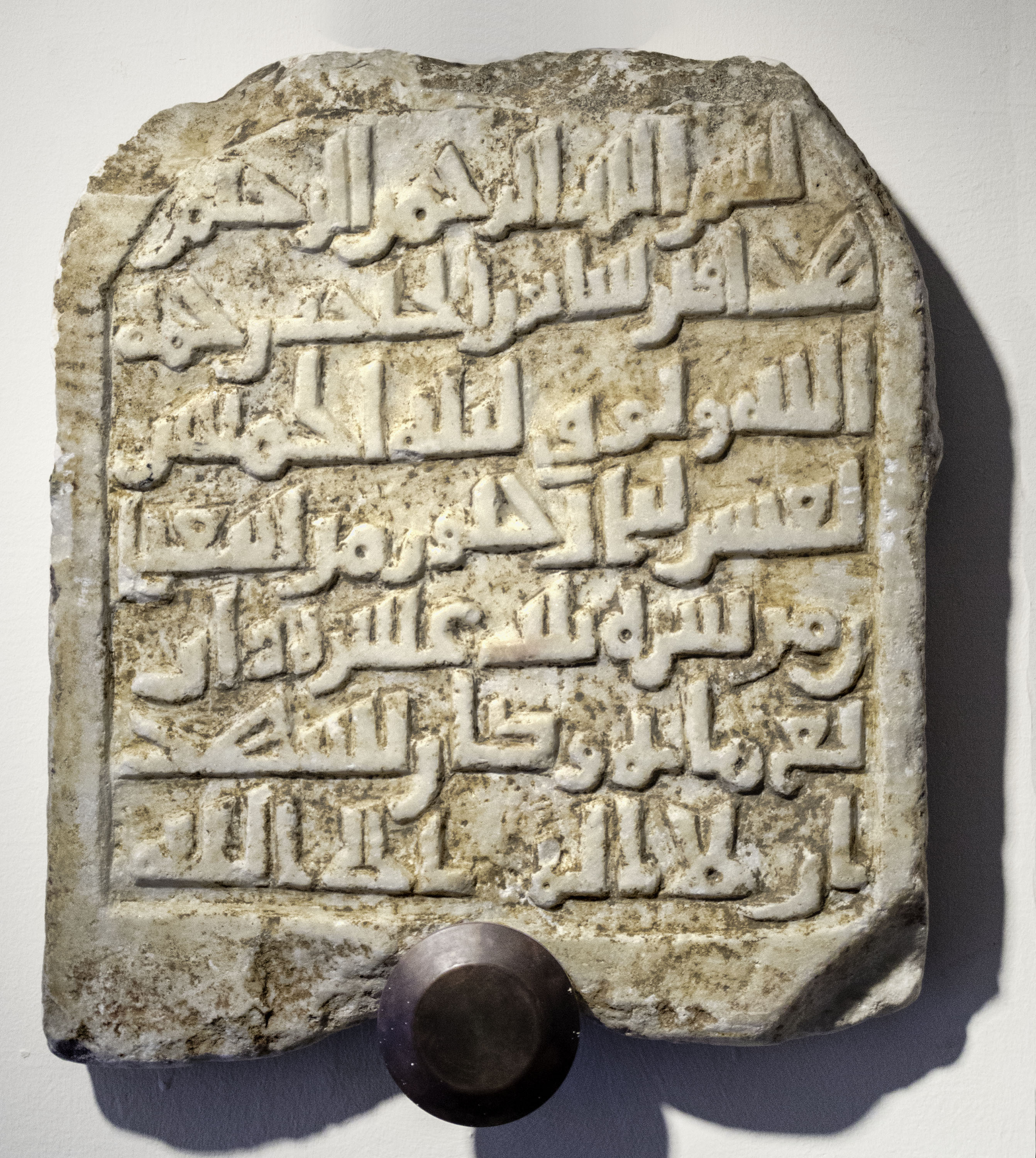
Gravestone of Sapur, first taifa king of Badajoz (11th century)
