= Timeline of Portuguese history (First County) =

Cristiano Ronaldo

This is a historical timeline of Portugal.

== First County of Portugal ==
=== 9th century ===
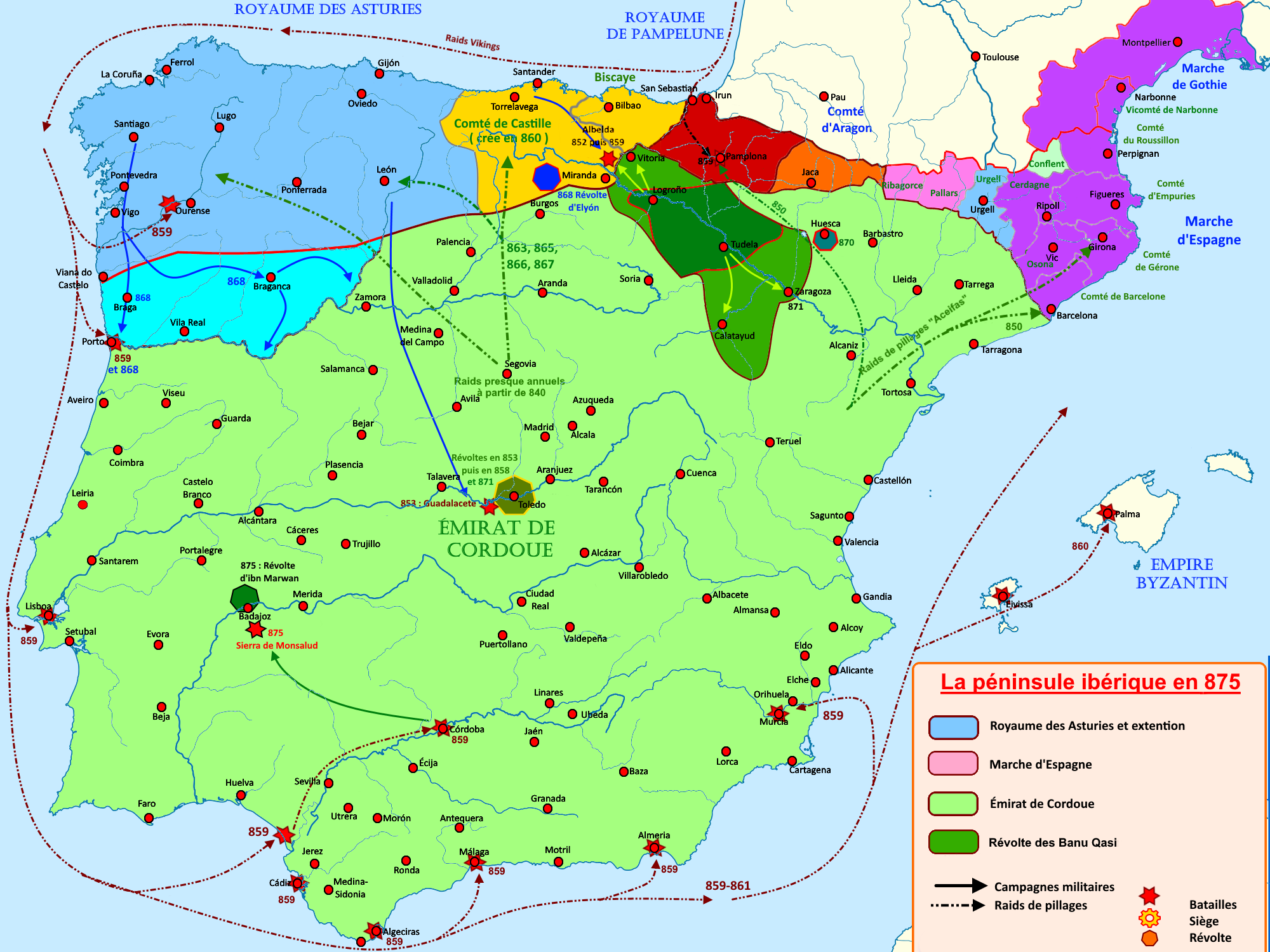
Iberian Peninsula around 875, with the region between the Minho and Douro Rivers show in cyan blue

- 868 – Establishment of the 1st County of Portugal, a fiefdom of the Kingdom of Asturias, by count Vímara Peres, after the reconquest from the Moors of the region between the Minho and Douro Rivers. Count Vímara Peres founded the fortified city that bears his own name Vimaranis, later Guimaranis, present day Guimarães, considered "The Cradle City" of Portugal.
- 871 – The city of Coimbra is reconquered from the Muslim Emirate of Córdoba. Hermenegildo Gutiérrez is appointed Count of Coimbra.
- 873 – Vímara Peres dies and his son Lucídio Vimaranes becomes Count of Portugal.

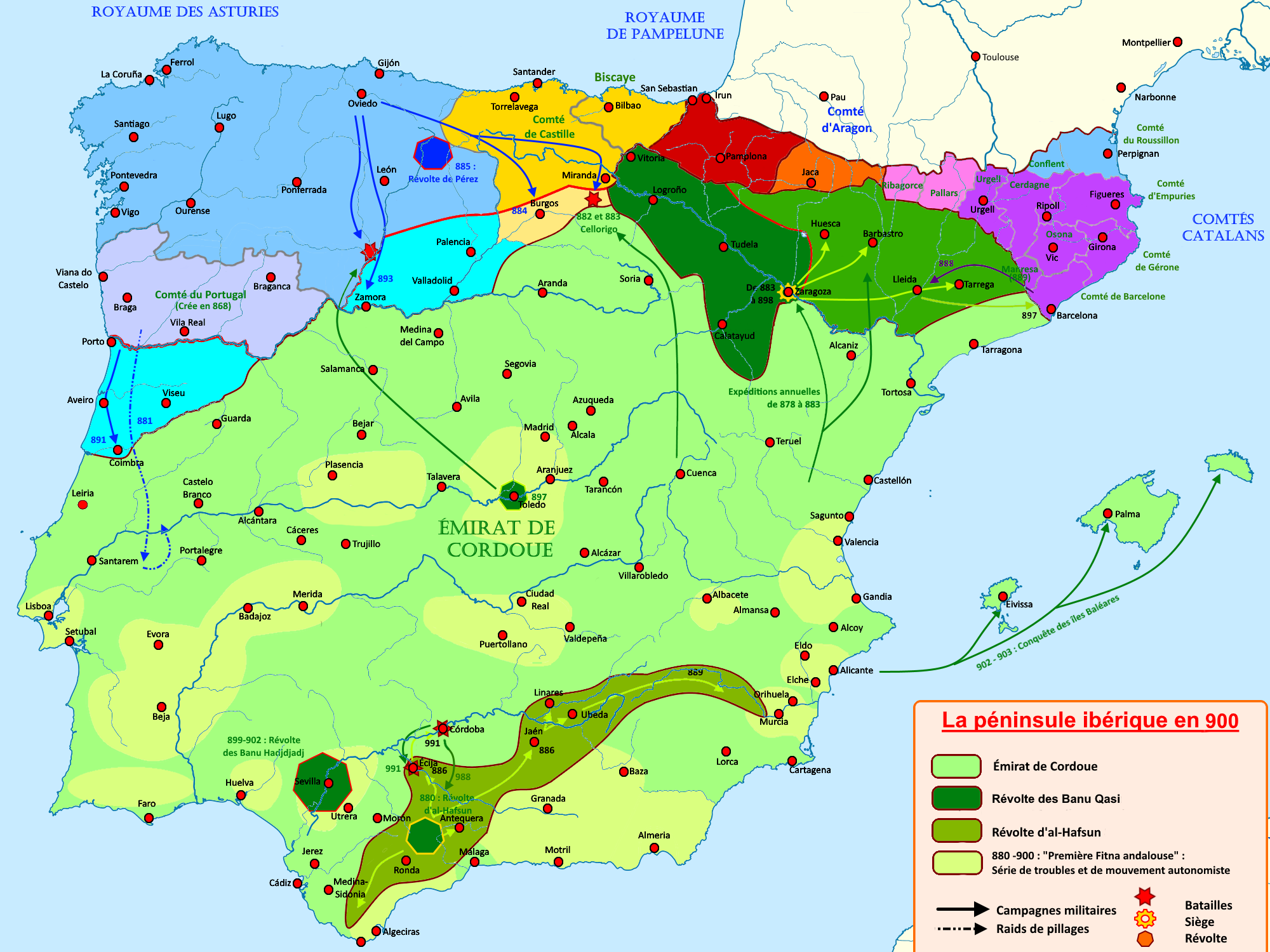
Iberian Peninsula around 900, with the County of Portugal show in lavender blue

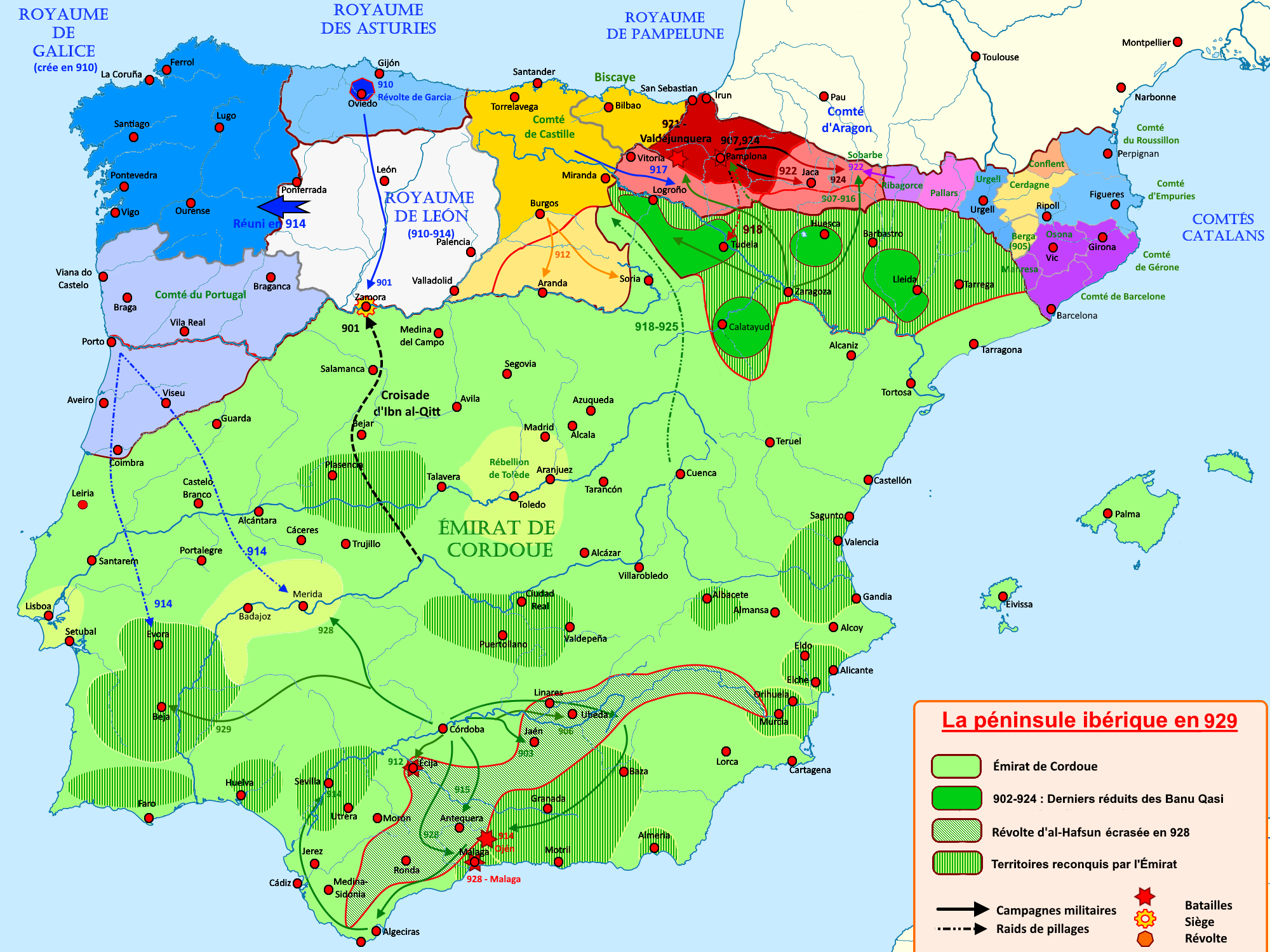
Iberian Peninsula around 929, with the County of Portugal show in lavender blue

=== 10th century ===
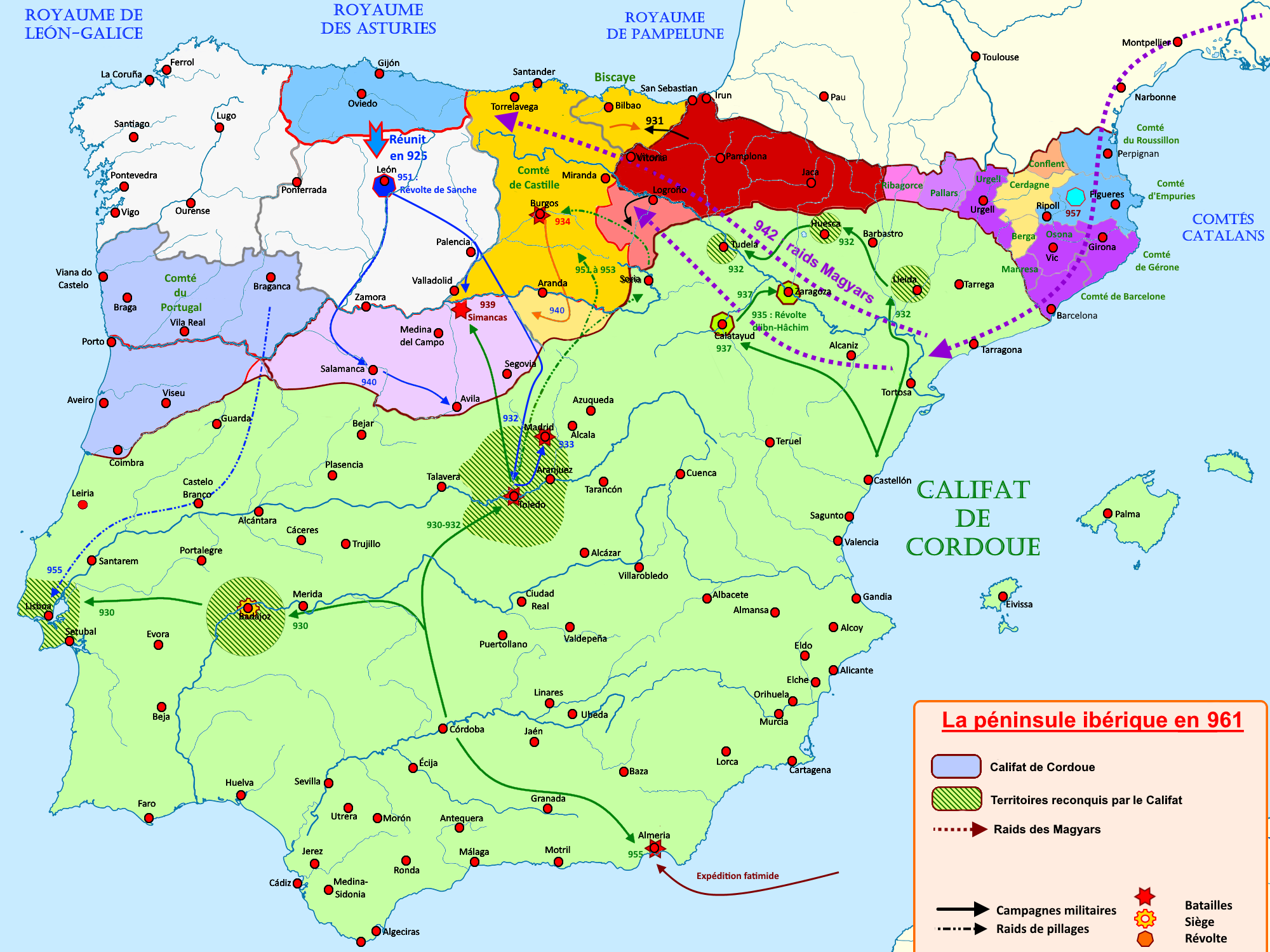
Iberian Peninsula around 961, with the County of Portugal show in lavender blue

- 909 – Alfonso III of Asturias is deposed by his sons yet also proclaimed Emperor.
- 910 – Alfonso III of Asturias dies and his kingdom is divided among his sons, with Ordoño becoming King of Galicia, Fruela becoming King of Asturias, and García I of León King of Leon.
- 911 – Count Hermenegildo Gutiérrez of Coimbra, dies and his son Arias Mendes becomes Count of Coimbra.
- 913 – An expedition commanded by King Ordoño of Galicia into Muslim territory takes Évora.
- 914 – Ordoño becomes King of Leon, after the death of his brother García I. The capital of the kingdom is moved from Oviedo to León, from which the Kingdom would derive its name.
- 916 – Ordoño II of León is defeated by the Emir Abd al-Rahman III in Valdejunquera.
- 918
  - Abd al-Rahman III defeats the Christians at the Battle of Talavera.
  - Pope John X recognizes the orthodoxy and legitimacy of the Visigothic Liturgy maintained in the Mozarabic rite.
- 922 – Diogo Fernandes succeeds Lucídio Vimaranes as Count of Portugal upon the latter's death.
- 924 – Fruela of Asturias succeeds his brother Ordoño on the thrones of León and also Galicia.
- 925 – Alfonso Fróilaz succeeds Fruela as king of Leon, Galicia and Asturias, but is deposed by his cousins Sancho Ordonhes who takes the throne of Galicia, and Alfonso, who takes the thrones of Asturias and Leon.
- 926 – Mendo I Gonçalves, son of Count Gonzalo Betotez of Galicia marries Mumadona Dias (daughter of count Diogo Fernandes and Onega) and becomes Count of Portugal.
- 928 – Gonçalo Moniz, grandson of Count Arias Mendes of Coimbra, becomes Count of Coimbra.
- 931 – Ramiro II becomes King of León. He was the first to bear the title King of Portuguese Land.
- 938 – First document where the word Portugal is written in its present form.
- 950
  - Countess Mumadona Dias of Portugal divides amongst her sons her the vast domains, upon the death of her husband Count Mendo I Gonçalves. Her son Gonçalo I Mendes becomes Count of Portugal.
  - Ordoño III becomes King of León.
- 953 – Large Muslim incursion in Galicia.
- 955 – Ordoño III of León attacks Lisbon.
- 956 – Sancho I becomes King of León.
- 958 – Sancho I of León is deposed and Ordoño IV becomes King of León.
- 959 – Countess Mumadona Dias donates vast estates to the Monastery of St. Mamede in Guimarães.
- 960 – Sancho I of León is reinstated as King of León.
- 966
  - Count Gonçalo Moniz of Coimbra rebels against Sancho I of León.
  - Count Gonçalo Mendes of Portugal assassinates Sancho of Leon.
  - Count Gonçalo Mendes of Portugal defeats Duke Rodrigo Velázques at the Battle of Aguioncha
  - Ramiro III becomes King of León.
  - Vikings raid Galicia and kill the bishop of Santiago de Compostela in battle, but his successor St. Rudesind rallies the local forces and kills the Viking King Gundered.
- 971 – Another minor Viking raid in Galicia.
- 976 – Caliph Al-Hakam II dies, and Al-Mansur Ibn Abi Aamir takes over in the name of his protégé Hisham II, becoming a military dictator usurping caliphal powers and launching a big number of offensive campaigns against the Christians.
- 981 – Count Gonçalo Moniz of Coimbra dies.
- 982 – Bermudo II becomes King of León, having been acclaimed by the Counts of Galicia and anointed in Santiago de Compostela.
- 987
  - Al-Mansur Ibn Abi Aamir lays waste to Coimbra, seizes the castles north of the Douro River, and reaches at the city of Santiago de Compostela. The city had been evacuated and Al-Mansur burns it to the ground and destroys the Church of Santiago.
  - Count Gonçalo I Mendes takes the personal title Magnus Dux Portucalensium (Grand-Duke of Portucale) and rebels against King Bermudo II of León, being defeated.
- 999
  - Alfonso V becomes King of León.
  - Mendo II Gonçalves, son (or grandson?) of Gonçalo I Mendes and Tuta, becomes Count of Portugal.
  - Countess Mumadona Dias dies.

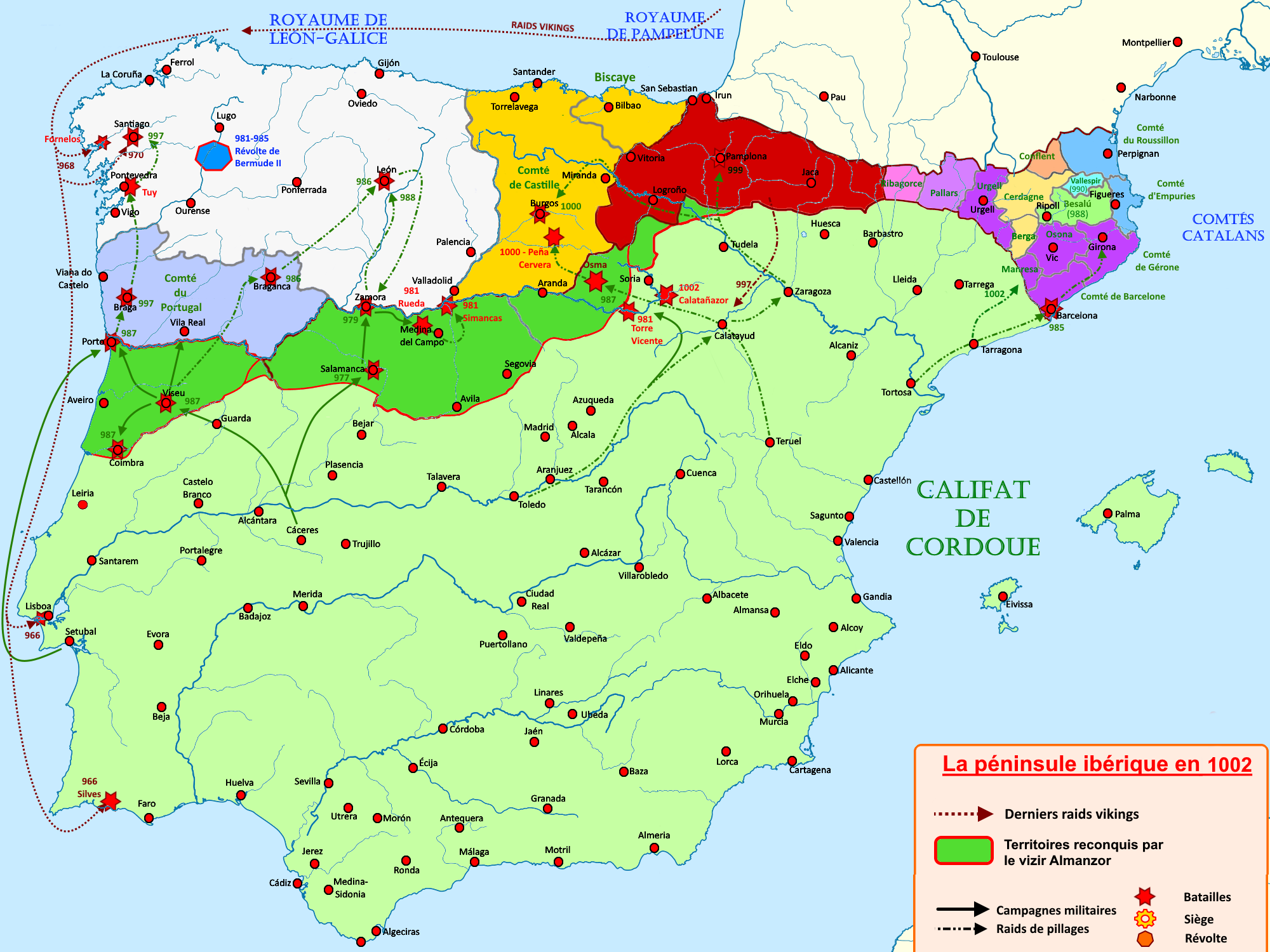
Iberian Peninsula around 1002, with the County of Portugal show in lavender blue

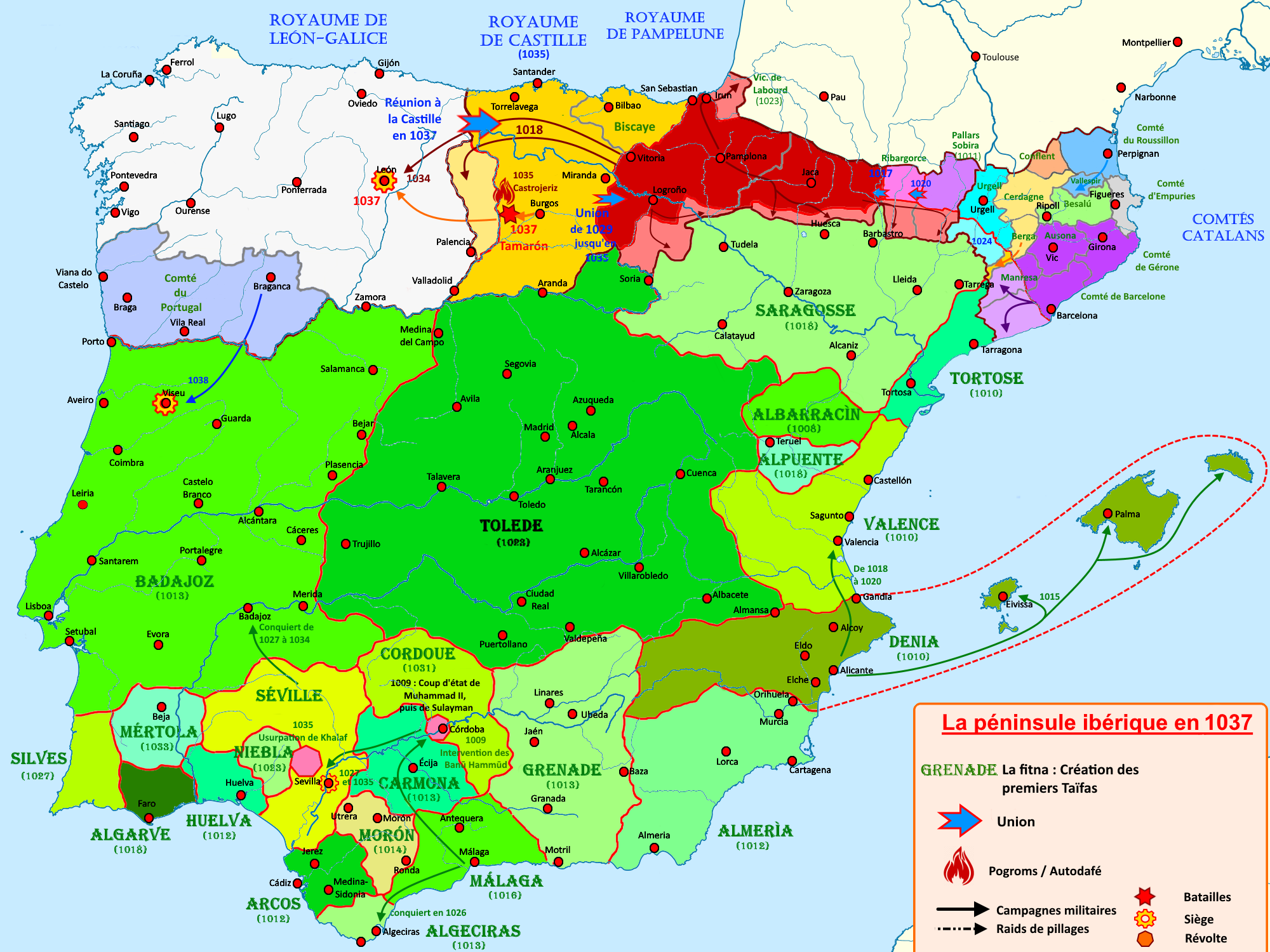
Iberian Peninsula around 1037, with the County of Portugal show in lavender blue

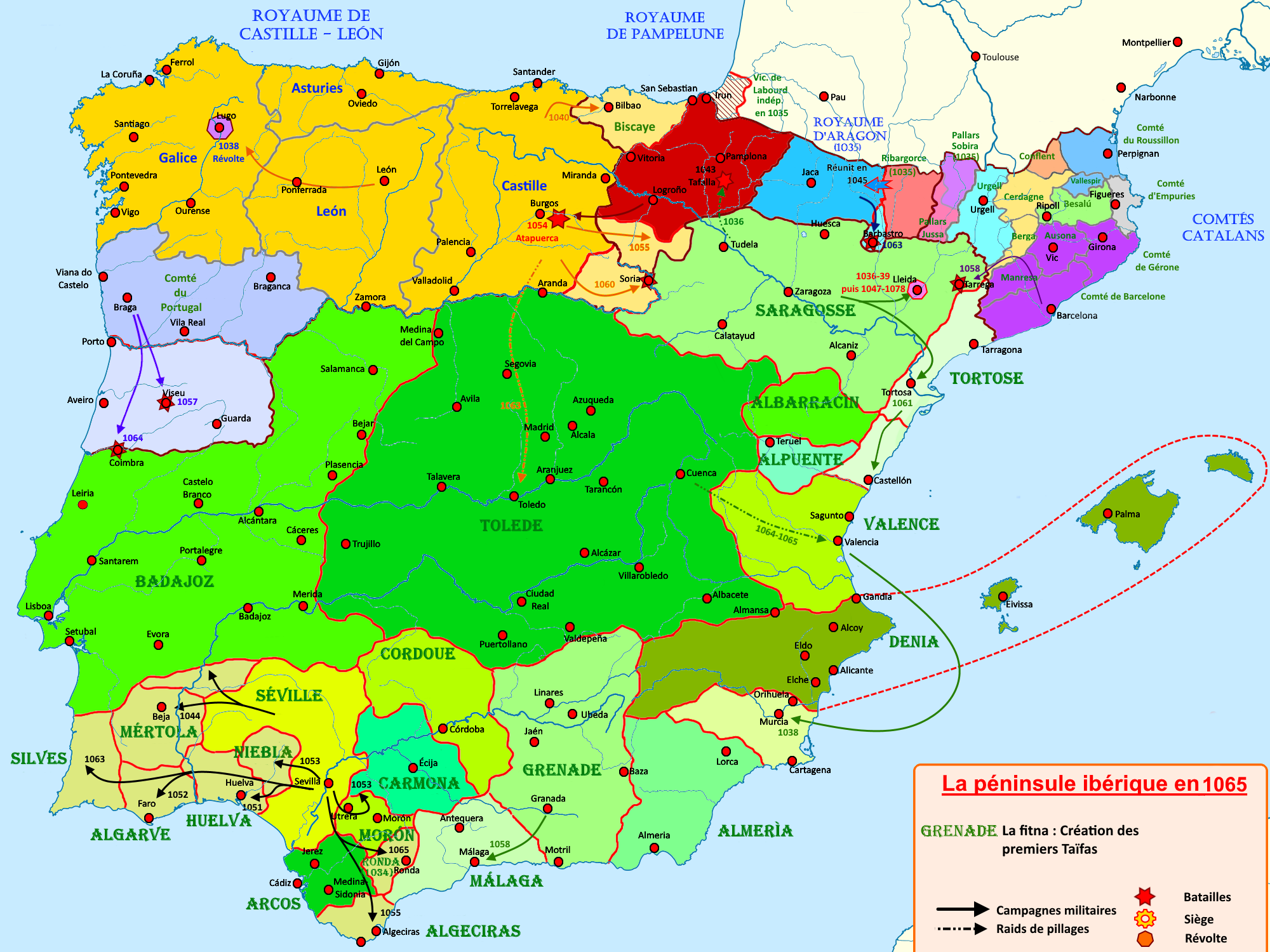
Iberian Peninsula around 1065, with the County of Portugal show in lavender blue

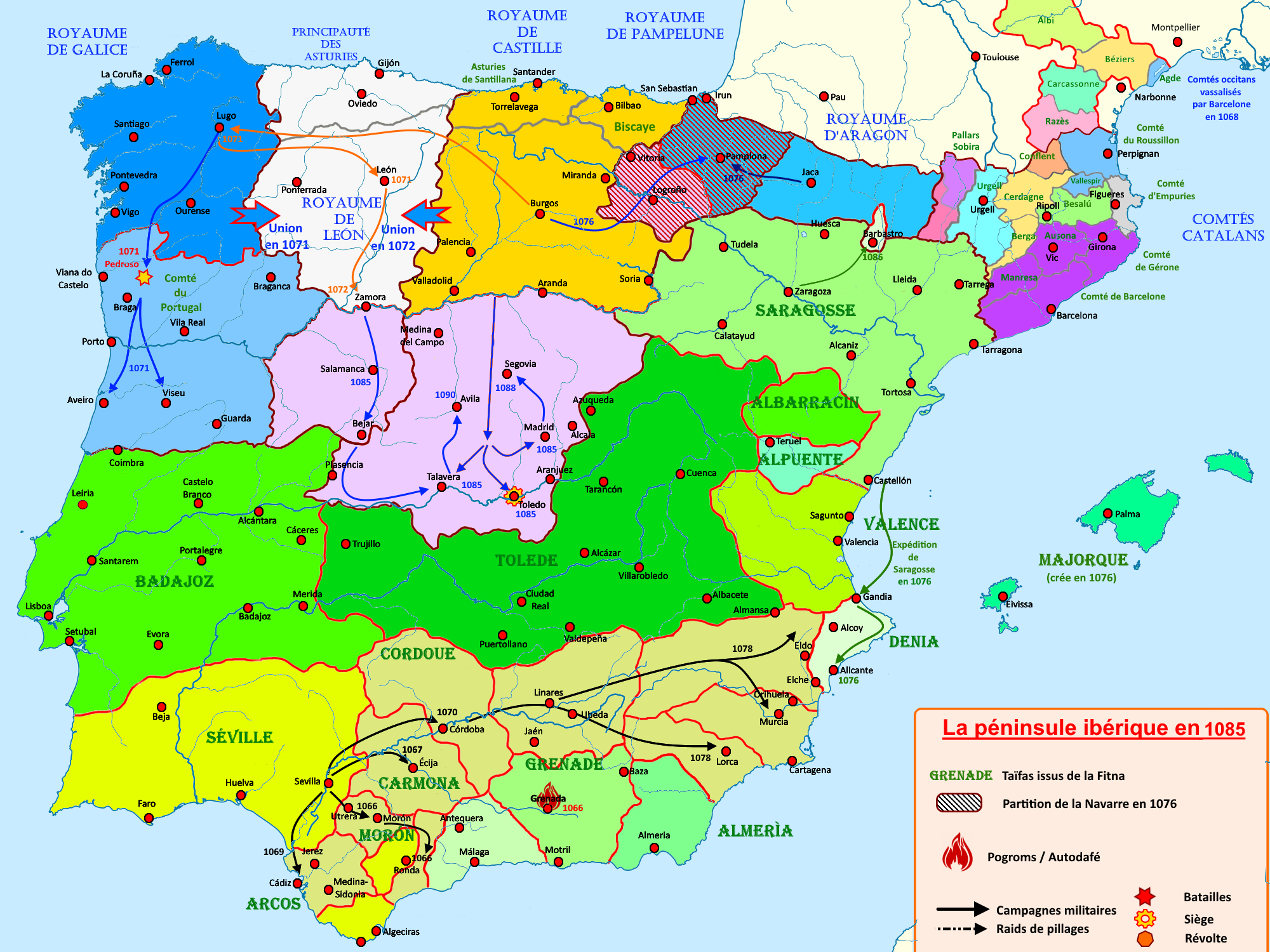
Iberian Peninsula around 1085, with the County of Portugal show in lavender blue

=== 11th century ===
- 1003 – Muslims lay waste to the city of León.
- 1008
  - Vikings raid Galicia, killing Count Mendo II Gonçalves of Portugal.
  - Alvito Nunes, of a collateral line but also descent of Vímara Peres, married to Countess Tudadomna, becomes Count of Portugal.
- 1009 – Caliphate of Córdoba begins to break up. The Taifa of Badajoz becomes independent of the Caliph Sulaiman al-Mustain of Córdoba and governs the territory between Coimbra and North Alentejo.
- 1016 – Norman invaders ascend the Minho river and destroy Tuy in Galicia.
- 1017 – Nuno I Alvites, son of Alvito Nunes and Tudadomna, becomes Count of Portugal. He marries Ilduara Mendes, daughter of Mendo II Gonçalves and Tuta.
- 1025 – Abu al-Qasim Muhammad ibn Abbad, Abbadid Emir of Seville, captures two castles at Alafões to the north-west of Viseu.
- 1028
  - Mendo III Nunes, son of Nuno I Alvites and Ilduara Mendes, becomes Count of Portugal.
  - Alfonso V, king of Asturias and León, lays siege to Viseu but is killed by a bolt from the walls.
  - Bermudo III, becomes King of León.
- 1031 – Sancho III of Navarre declares war on Bermudo III of León. Navarre, sometimes assisted by Galician rebels and Normans, ravages the lands around Lugo in Galicia.
- 1034
  - The Leonese destroy a raiding force under Ismail ibn Abbad of Seville. Ismail ibn Abbad flees to Lisbon.
  - Gonçalo Trastemires – a Portuguese frontiersman – captures Montemor castle on the Mondego river.
  - By 1034, Sancho the Great of Navarre had incorporated Aragon, Sobrarbe, Barcelona, as well as Asturias, León and Castile, and he proclaims himself Rex Hispaniarum ("King of all Spains").
- 1035
  - Sancho III of Navarre, Aragon, Leon and Castille dies and distributes his lands among his three sons; Castile and Aragon become kingdoms.
  - Bermudo III of León defeats the Moors at the Battle of Cesar, in the Aveiro region.
- 1037 – Ferdinand of Castile defeats and kills his father-in-law, Bermudo III of León at the Battle of Tamarón, and takes the title of King of Leon.
- 1039 – Ferdinand of Castille and León proclaims himself Emperor of all Hispania.
- 1050 – Count Mendo III Nunes of Portugal is killed in battle sometime during this period. His son Nuno II Mendes succeeds him as Count of Portugal.
- 1057 – Ferdinand of Castille and León conquers Lamego from the Muslims.
- 1058 – Emir Al-Muzaffar al-Aftas pays the Christians to leave Badajoz, but not before Viseu being conquered by Ferdinand I of Castile and León.
- 1060 – The council (Ecumenical Synod) of Santiago de Compostela begins.
- 1064
  - Ferdinand I of León and Castile besieges Muslim Coimbra from 20 January until 9 July. The Muslim governor who surrendered is allowed to leave with his family, but 5,000 inhabitants are taken captive, and all Muslims are forced out of Portuguese territory across the Mondego river. The Mozarabic lord Sisnando Davides, who led the siege, becomes Count of Coimbra.
  - The Hispanic calendar is adopted.
- 1065 – Death of Ferdinand of Léon and Castille. His kingdom is divided amongst his sons, with Garcia taking the throne of Galicia, while Alfonso VI takes Leon and Sancho II takes Castille.
- 1070 – Count Nuno II Mendes of Portugal revolts against King Garcia II of Galicia.
- 1071 – After defeating and killing Count Nuno Mendes of Portugal at the Battle of Pedroso near Braga, Garcia II of Galicia annexes Portugal to Galicia and adopts the title King of Galicia and Portugal. The County of Portugal ceases to exist as an autonomous entity for the time being.

== See also ==
- Timeline of Portuguese history
  - Al'Garb Al'Andalus and the beginning of the Reconquista (8th to 9th century)
  - Second County of Portugal (11th to 12th century)
