= Timeline of 8th- and 9th-century Portuguese history =

Historical timeline of Portugal

This is a historical timeline of Portugal.

== Al'Garb Al'Andalus and the beginning of the Reconquista ==
=== 8th century ===
- 711 March 15 – Muslim Umayyads, faithful to the Emir of Damascus and under the Berber Tariq ibn-Ziyad, invade and eventually conquer the Iberian Peninsula (Visigothic King Roderic is killed while opposing the invasion), except for the northernmost part – the Asturias. Resistance to Moorish rule (Reconquista) starts from this stronghold.
- 713 – Musa ibn Nusayr, governor of North Africa, conquers Medina-Sidonia, Seville and Mértola.
- 714–715 – Abd al-Aziz, Musa ibn Nusayr's son, conquers Évora, Santarém and Coimbra.
- 715 – Abd al-Aziz is left in charge and makes his capital the city of Seville, where he marries Egilona, widow of Visigothic King Roderic. The Umayyad Caliph Sulayman ibn Abd al-Malik, a paranoid ruler, will have Abd el-Aziz assassinated and sends Musa ibn Nusayr into exile in his native Yemen village to live out his days as a beggar.
- 716 – Lisbon is captured by the Moors.
- 717 – Córdoba becomes the capital of Muslim holdings in the Al-Andalus.
- 718 – Pelayo establishes the Kingdom of Asturias. This is considered to be the beginning of the Reconquista.
- 722 – A powerful Moorish force sent to conquer Asturias once and for all is defeated by king Pelayo at the Battle of Covadonga. Today, this is regarded as the first significant Christian victory of the Reconquista.
- 737
  - King Pelayo of Asturias dies.
  - Favila, son of Pelayo, becomes King of Asturias.
- 739
  - Alfonso, son of Peter, Duke of Cantabria, and married to Ermesinda, daughter of Pelayo of Asturias, becomes King of Asturias.
  - the Moors are driven out of Galicia by Alfonso I of Asturias.
- 740–742 – Berber revolts against Arab Umayyad overlords.
- 755 – Abd al-Rahman I of the Umayyad dynasty flees to Iberia to escape the Abbasids and would be responsible for creating "the Golden Caliphate".
- 756 – The Umayyad Abd al-Rahman I defeats Yusuf al-Fihri and becomes Commander of al-Andalus Muslims, proclaiming himself Emir of Córdoba.
- 757 – Fruela I becomes King of Asturias.
- 763 – Abd al-Rahman I suppresses an Abbasid inspired revolt.
- 768 – Aurelio becomes King of Asturias.
- 768–777 – a Berber reformer rebels in central Iberia and occupies Mérida and other towns to the north of the Tagus. The rebellion is suppressed after nine years.
- 774 – Silo becomes King of Asturias. In this period this is a lot of unrest in Galicia towards the rule of Asturias.
- 783 – Mauregato the Usurper becomes King of Asturias. He was an illegitimate son of Alfonso I of Asturias, supposedly by a Moorish woman.
- 788
  - Death of Abd al-Rahman I, founder of the Umayyad Emirate of Córdoba. His successor is Hisham I.
  - Bermudo I becomes King of Asturias.
- 791
  - Alfonso II becomes King of Asturias in Oviedo and conquers a number of Moorish strongholds and settles the lands south of the Douro River.
  - A Muslim force raids into Galicia.
- 794 – Asturians defeat the Muslims at the Battle of Lutos.
- 796 – Al-Hakam I becomes Umayyad Emir of Córdoba.
- 798 – In a raid on Muslim lands, Alfonso II of Asturias enters Lisbon but cannot occupy it.

=== 9th century ===
- 800–81010 year rebellion against the Muslims breaks out in the fringes of Al-Andalus (Lisbon, Mérida, Toledo). Each rebellion is bloodily suppressed by the central Islamic authorities.
- 809 – An Umayyad prince defeats and executes Tumlus, a Muslim rebel who had seized power in Lisbon some years before.
- 813 – The grave of James the Apostle is "discovered" near Santiago de Compostela, in Galicia, beginning the cult of St. James that would unite Iberian Christians of many different petty kingdoms.
- 822 – Abd ar-Rahman II becomes Umayyad Emir of Córdova.
- 825 – Moors attempt to invade Christian territory from Coimbra and Viseu but are driven back.
- 839 – Alfonso II of Asturias commands a military force in the region of Viseu.
- 842 – Ramiro I becomes King of Asturias.
- 844
  - Vikings raid the Galician estuaries, are defeated by Ramiro I of Asturias, attack Lisbon, Beja and the Algarve, and sack Seville.
  - Battle of Clavijo, legendary battle between Christians led by Ramiro I of Asturias and Muslims, where St. James is said to have helped the Christian Army.
- 850 – Ordoño I of Asturias becomes King of Asturias in Oviedo. Beginning of Christian repopulation. Rise of the county of Castile.
- 852 – Muhammad I becomes Umayyad Emir of Córdova.
- 859 – Ordoño I of Asturias defeats Musa ibn Musa at Albelda.
- 866 – eAlfonso III the Great, son of Ordoño I of Asturias, becomes King of Asturias. He initiates the repopulation of Porto, Coimbra, Viseu and Lamego.

== See also ==
- Timeline of Portuguese history
  - Germanic Kingdoms (5th to 8th century)
  - First County of Portugal (9th to 11th century)
