= Rena, Badajoz =

Coordinates: 39°03′N 05°48′W

Rena
- Coat of arms
- Interactive map of Rena
- Country: Spain
- Autonomous community: Extremadura
- Province: Badajoz
- Comarca: Vegas Altas

Government
  - Alcalde: Desirée Vázquez Becerra

Area
  - Total: 10.8 km^{2} (4.2 sq mi)
- Elevation: 254 m (833 ft)

Population (2025-01-01)
  - Total: 605
- Time zone: UTC+1 (CET)
  - Summer (DST): UTC+2 (CEST)
- Website: Ayuntamiento de Rena

Rena is a Spanish municipality in the province of Badajoz, Extremadura. It has a population of 650 (2007) and an area of 10.8 km^{2} (4.2 sq mi).

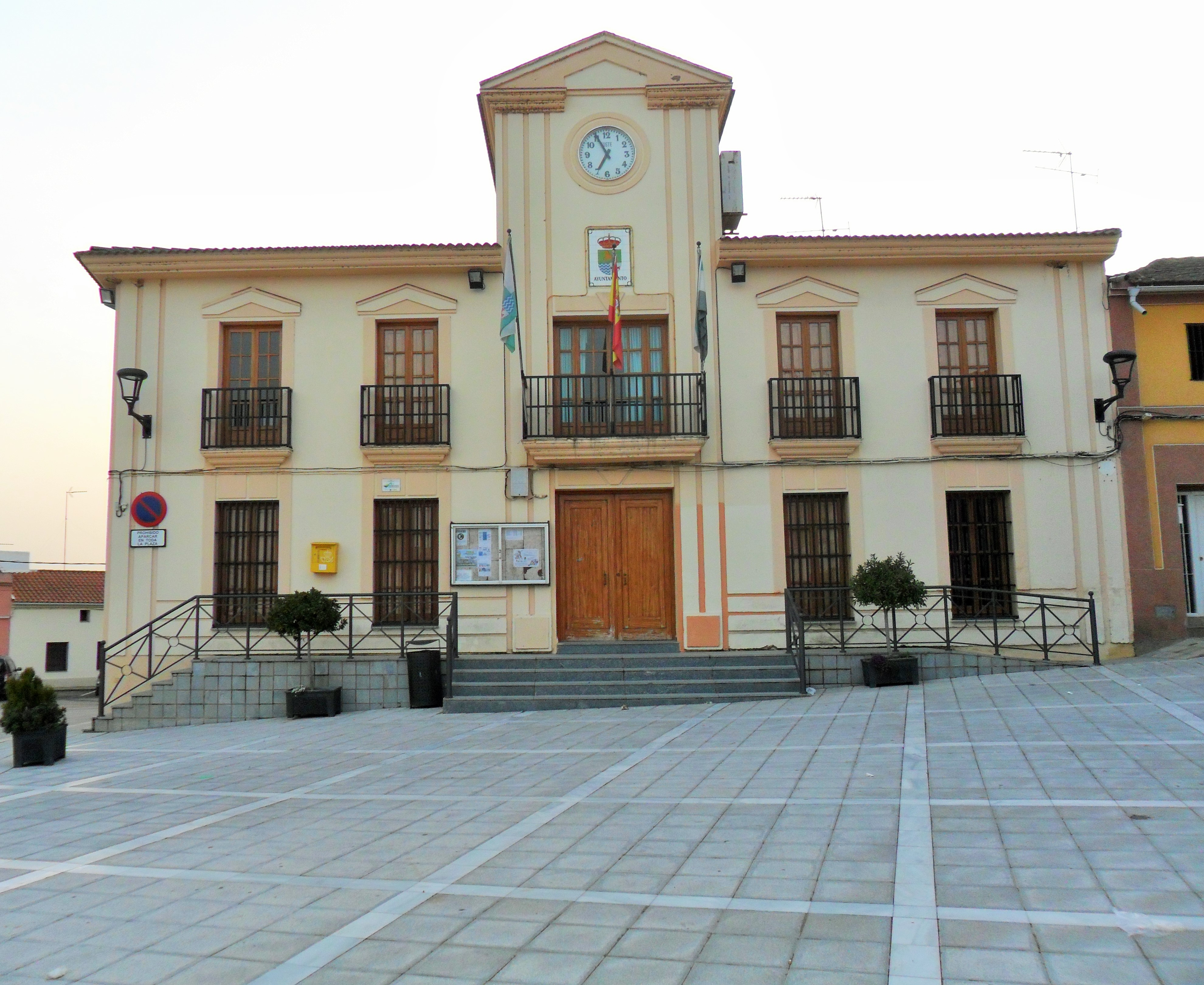
Rena Town Hall

== See also ==
- List of municipalities in Badajoz
