= Aftasid dynasty =

11th-century Arabized Iberian-Berber dynasty

Aftasid dynasty بنو الأفطس
- ruling dynasty
- Country: Taifa of Badajoz
- Founded: 1022
- Founder: Abdallah ibn Al-Aftas
- Titles: Sultan
- Dissolution: 1094

The Aftasid dynasty (Arabic: بنو الأفطس, romanized: Banu al-Aftas) was an Arabized Iberian-Berber dynasty that ruled the Taifa of Badajoz in Al-Andalus, from 1022 to 1094. Information about their lineage before becoming independent rulers in Badajoz is scarce and, according to Ibn Hayyan, the founder ibn Al-Aftas (a Miknasa Berber) came from a family without social status.

== History ==
When the Caliphate of Cordoba broke up into the Taifa kingdoms, the mercenary Abdallah ibn Muhammad ibn Maslamah ibn al-Aftas (1022–1045), a Berber from the Miknasa tribe, took control of Badajoz, by death of Sabur Al-Saqlabi, who was a Slavic serf, previously serving at the court of Caliph al-Hakam II, that had proclaimed himself Lord of Badajoz in 1009, and that Ibn al-Aftas served. Ibn al-Aftas added to his name the Laqab al-Mansur Billah, Victorious by Grace of God, and ruled over an extensive part of the Al Garb Al Andalus, from the Douro river to the south of Tagus river, establishing the Taifa of Badajoz. Ibn al-Aftas died in 1045.

Under Ibn al-Aftas' successors, Abu Bakr Muhammad ibn Abdallah al-Muzzaffar (1045–1065) and his two sons 'Umar ibn Muhammad al-Mutawakkil (1065–1094 in Évora) and Yahya ibn Muhammad al-Mansur (1065–1072 in Badajoz), the Taifa of Badajoz not only controlled large expanses of western Spain and Portugal, but was also a major centre of Islamic culture, which was fostered by the Aftasid rulers. In 1055, Badajoz came under the suzerainty of the Kingdom of León-Castile and was forced to pay tribute. The taifa lost control over significant parts of its territory, south of the Mondego river (south of Coimbra). The Abbadid dynasty of Seville conquered parts of their territory. In 1094, the kingdom was annexed by the Almoravid dynasty. Badajoz was taken at the end of 1095 by the Almoravid general Abu Bakr, with the connivance of the inhabitants who were fed up of the fiscal exactions of their emir, Umar ibn Muhammad al-Mutawakkil.

Al-Mutawakkil and two of his sons Al-Fadl and S'ad, were taken prisoner and sent to Seville, but were executed before their arrival, which was eulogized in a poem by Ibn 'Abdun. Another son of Al-Mutawakkil, Al-Mansur, escaped and fortified himself for some time in the Castillo de Montánchez, and finally together with his followers, migrated into the dominions of Alfonso VI, where he abandoned Islam for Christianity.

== Aftasid rulers ==
- Abdallah ibn Al-Aftas (1022-1045)
- Muhammad b. 'Abdallah, Abu Bakr al-Muzaffar (1045-1068)
- Yahya b. Muhammad (1068)
- 'Umar b. Muhammad, Abu Hafs al-Mutawakkil (1068-1094), killed 1094 or 1095

== See also ==
- Taifa of Badajoz
