= Cesar, Portugal =

Cesar
- Civil parish
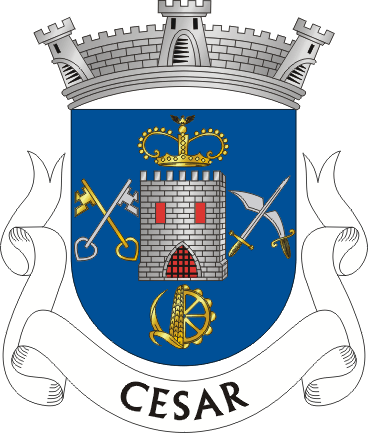
- Coat of arms

- Location in Portugal
- Coordinates: 40.918°N 8.439°W
- Country: Portugal
- Region: Norte
- Metropolitan area: Porto
- District: Aveiro
- Municipality: Oliveira de Azeméis

Area
  - Total: 5.43 km^{2} (2.10 sq mi)

Population (2011)
  - Total: 3,166
  - Density: 580/km^{2} (1,500/sq mi)
- Time zone: UTC+00:00 (WET)
  - Summer (DST): UTC+01:00 (WEST)

Cesar is a civil parish in the municipality of Oliveira de Azeméis, Portugal. The population in 2011 was 3,166, in an area of 5.43 km^{2}. It received town status on 13 July 1990. The Battle of Cesar took place here.
