= Sabur al-Saqlabi =

Badajoz king

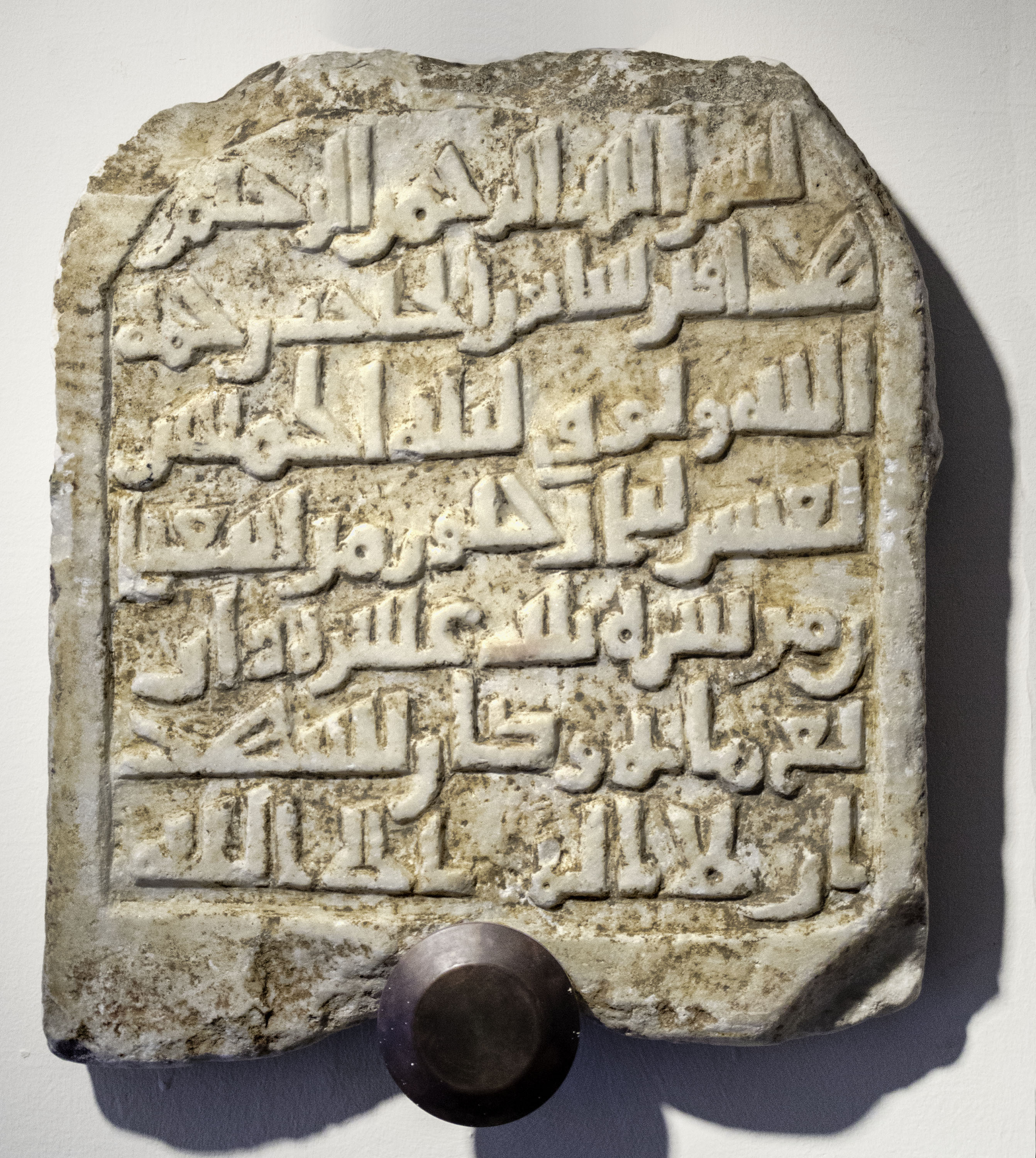
Funerary gravestone of Sabur. Archaeological Museum of Badajoz.

Sabur al-Saqlabi (died 1022) was a non-Arab freedman who became the first taifa king of Badajoz.

Originally a palatial slave, he was freed by Al-Hakam II. The al-Saqlabi from his name means "the Slavic". He is theorized to perhaps have a Persian background, due to Sabur being the arabization of the Persian name Sapor. He was sent by Hisham II's hadjib Al Mansur to rule as wali of the western province of al-Andalus (Al-Gharb). He proclaimed himself independent amid the fitna of al-Andalus (1009–1031). Sabur, traditionally loyal to the Umayyads, may have self-proclaimed once the Umayyad caliph was routed by the Hammudids (1016). Other sources point to 1009 or 1013. Following his death in 1022, his Aftasid visir, Abd Allah, seized power in the taifa.
