= Abdallah ibn Al-Aftas =

- Born: c. ?
- Died: c. 1045
- Dynasty: Bani Al-Aftas

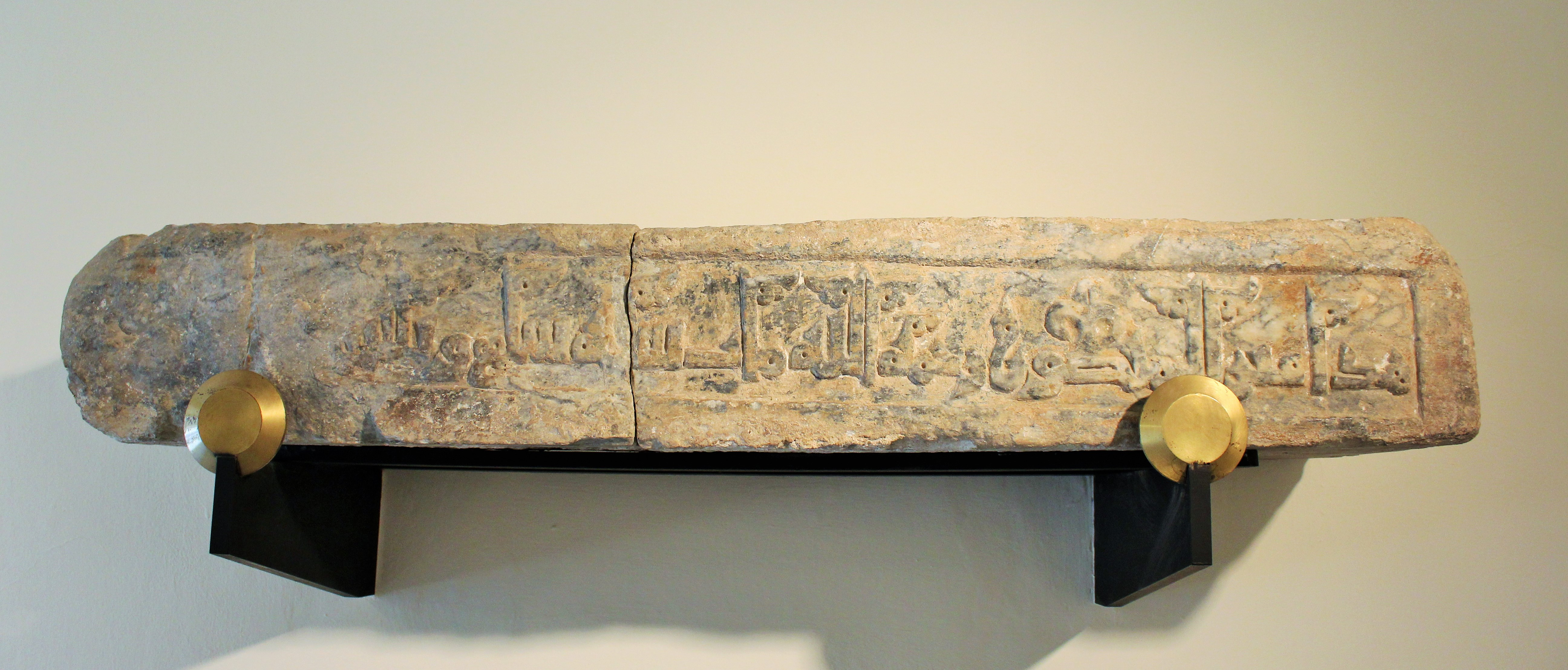
Tombstone of al-Mansur

Abd Allah ibn Muhammad ibn Maslama (Arabic: عبد الله بن محمد بن مسلمه ابن الأفطس) (c. ? – c. 1045), surnamed Ibn al-Aftas, was the founder of the Aftasid dynasty of the taifa of Badajoz, in what was then Al-Andalus. He was a miknasa berber from the Córdoba region. Ibn al-Aftas became the vizier of Sabur al-Saqlabi, a former slave of Caliph al-Hakam II, who became prince of the lower march of the former Caliphate of Cordoba. On the death of Sabur in 1022, Ibn al-Aftas seized power, and Badajoz under his leadership, became the capital of a principality centered on Guadiana and extending over central Portugal. He was a prominent military tactician and was surnamed "Al-Mansur" (the victorious). He died about 1045 AD.
