= Taifa of Badajoz =

Emirate in Iberia (1009–1150)

Coordinates: 38.8772°N 6.9717°W

Taifa of Badajoz طائفة بطليوس (Arabic)
- 1009–1150
- Taifa Kingdom of Badajoz, c. 1037.
- Capital: Batalyaws, currently in the Province of Badajoz, Extremadura, Spain
- Common languages: Andalusi Arabic, Mozarabic
- Religion: Islam, Chalcedonian Christianity (pre-schism), Roman Catholicism (post-schism), Judaism
- Government: Monarchy
- Historical era: Middle Ages
  - Downfall of Caliphate of Córdoba: 1009
  - To the Almoravids: 1094–1144
  - Conquered by the Almohads: 1150
- Currency: Dirham and Dinar
Preceded by	Succeeded by
Caliphate of Córdoba	Almoravid dynasty; Almohad dynasty
- Today part of: Portugal; Spain

The Taifa of Badajoz (from Arabic: طائفة بطليوس) was a medieval Islamic Moorish kingdom located in what is now parts of Portugal and Spain. It was centred on the city of Badajoz which exists today as the first city of Extremadura, in Spain.

== History ==
The taifa of Badajoz rose, like the other taifa kingdoms of the Iberian Peninsula, after the fragmentation of al-Andalus (the Caliphate of Cordoba) in the late 10th and early 11th centuries. It was created by Sabur al-Saqlabi, a former slave of perhaps Slavic or Persian origin. The taifa's control extended over most of ancient Lusitania, including Mérida and Lisbon. Sabur was succeeded in 1022 by his vizier, Abdallah ibn al-Aftas, who founded the Aftasid dynasty. Sabur's sons fled to Lisbon, where they created the short-lived taifa of Lisbon, which was soon reconquered by Badajoz. In 1055 Badajoz became a tributary of the Kingdom of León-Castile, losing significant parts of its territory south of the Mondego River (south of Coimbra). The Abbadids of Seville also conquered parts of their territory.

After the death of Abdallah's son, Abu Bakr, a civil war broke out between the latter's sons, Yahya and Abu, the former being victorious. His troops fought alongside the Almoravid dynasty against the Christian army in the Battle of Sagrajas (1086), which occurred not far from Badajoz. However, after the Almoravid victory, Yahya, who feared their increasing power, allied with Alfonso VI of Castile. In 1094 the Almoravids occupied Badajoz and Yahya was killed together with two of his sons. A surviving son fled first to Montánchez and then to Alfonso's court.

After the taifa's original territory had been controlled by various kingdoms (Almoravids, Almohads, Portugal) in succession, a second independent taifa was briefly recreated in Badajoz, existing from 1144 to 1150, when it fell again under Almohad dominion.

== Emirs of Badajoz ==
=== 1st Taifa period (11th century) ===
Banu Sabur (Saqlabi)

- Sabur al-Saqlabi 1009-1022
- Abu Muhammad Abdallah ibn Muhammad al-Sabur al-Saqlabi 1013–1022
- 'Abd al-Aziz ibn Sabur al-Saqlabi 1022
- 'Abd al-Malik ibn Sabur al-Saqlabi 1022 (in Lishbuna)

Banu Aftas (Aftasids)

- Abdallah ibn Muhammad ibn Maslamah ibn al-Aftas 1022–1044 (Al-Mansur I)
- Abu Bakr Muhammad ibn Abdallah al-Aftas 1045–1066 (Modafar I)
- Yahya ibn Abu Bakr Muhammad al-Aftas 1067-1073/1079 (Al-Mansur II)
- Muhammad ibn Abu Bakr Muhammad al-Aftas 1079-1093
- Fadl ibn Muhammad al-Aftas 1080-1093 (in Alqantara)
- Abbas ibn Muhammad al-Aftas 1080-1093 (in Qasr 'Abi Dans)
- Umar ibn Muhamad al-Aftas 1081-1093 (in Martila)
- To Almoravids 1094

=== 2nd Taifa period (12th century) ===
Banu Wazir

- Siddray ibn Wazir al-Wazir 1142-1145

Banu Hayy

- Hakam ibn Muhammad al-Hayy 1116-1143 (in Alqantara)
- Muhammad ibn Hakam al-Hayy 1146-1149
- To Almohads 1150

== See also ==
- List of Sunni Muslim dynasties
