= 1270 in France =

- Decades: 1250s; 1260s; 1270s; 1280s; 1290s
- See also: History of France; Timeline of French history; List of years in France

1270 in France included the following events in French history:

== Deaths ==
- Louis IX of France died.
