= 1267 in France =

- Decades: 1240s; 1250s; 1260s; 1270s; 1280s
- See also: History of France; Timeline of French history; List of years in France

Events from the year 1267 in France.

== Incumbents ==
- Monarch - Louis IX

== Events ==
- 24 March - In a parliament held in Sainte-Chapelle, King Louis IX and his three sons declared their intention to take part in the Eighth Crusade.
- 12 June - Philip I became the new Count of Savoy.

=== Full dates unknown ===
- Construction of Château de Vixouze was initiated.
- Roger-Bernard III, Count of Foix married Margaret of Béarn.

== Births ==
=== Full dates unknown ===
- Rainier I, Lord of Cagnes (died 1314)

== Deaths ==
- 17 March - Pierre de Montreuil, French architect (birth date unknown)
- 23 September - Beatrice of Provence, Countess Regnant of Provence (born 1229)
- 30 September - John, Count of Chalon, French noble (born 1190)

=== Full dates unknown ===
- Beatrice of Savoy, former Countess Consort of Provence (born 1198)

== See also ==
Media related to 1267 in France at Wikimedia Commons
