= Muhammad II of Granada =

Sultan of Granada from 1273 to 1302

Muhammad II al-Faqih

Sultan of Granada
- Reign: 22 January 1273 – 8 April 1302
- Predecessor: Muhammad I
- Successor: Muhammad III
- Born: c. 1235; Arjona, Taifa of Arjona
- Died: 8 April 1302 (aged 66–67); Granada, Emirate of Granada
- Issue: Muhammad III; Nasr; Fatima
- House: Nasrid dynasty
- Father: Muhammad I
- Mother: Aisha
- Religion: Islam

Muhammad II (Arabic: محمد الثاني) (also known by the epithet al-Faqih, "the canon-lawyer", c. 1235 – 8 April 1302; reigned from 1273 until his death) was the second Nasrid ruler of the Emirate of Granada in Al-Andalus on the Iberian Peninsula, succeeding his father, Muhammad I. Already experienced in matters of state when he ascended the throne, he continued his father's policy of maintaining independence in the face of Granada's larger neighbours, the Christian kingdom of Castile and the Muslim Marinid state of Morocco, as well as an internal rebellion by his family's former allies, the Banu Ashqilula.

After he took the throne, he negotiated a treaty with Alfonso X of Castile, in which Castile agreed to end support for the Banu Ashqilula in exchange for payments. When Castile took the money but maintained its support for the Banu Ashqilula, Muhammad turned towards Abu Yusuf of the Marinids. The Marinids sent a successful expedition against Castile, but relations soured when the Marinids treated the Banu Ashqilula as Muhammad's equals. In 1279, through diplomatic manoeuvring, Muhammad regained Málaga, formerly the centre of Banu Ashqilula power. In 1280, his diplomacy backfired when Granada faced simultaneous attacks from Castile, the Marinids and the Banu Ashqilula. Attacked by his more powerful neighbours, Muhammad exploited the rift between Alfonso and his son Sancho, as well as receiving help from Volunteers of the Faith, soldiers recruited from North Africa. The threat subsided when Alfonso died in 1284 and Abu Yusuf in 1286; their successors (Sancho and Abu Yaqub, respectively) were preoccupied with domestic matters. In 1288 the Banu Ashqilula emigrated to North Africa at Abu Yaqub's invitation, removing Muhammad's biggest domestic concern. In 1292, Granada helped Castile take Tarifa from the Marinids on the understanding that the town would be traded to Granada, but Sancho reneged on the promise. Muhammad II then switched to the Marinid side, but a Granadan–Marinid attempt to retake Tarifa in 1294 failed. In 1295, Sancho died and was succeeded by Ferdinand IV, a minor. Granada took advantage by conducting a successful campaign against Castile, taking Quesada and Alcaudete. Muhammad also planned a joint offensive with Aragon against Castile, but he died in 1302 before the operation took place.

During his 25-year rule, Muhammad consolidated the state founded by his father and implemented administrative and military reforms. He instituted the Nasrid royal protocol and the court chancery, organized the Volunteers of the Faith—troops recruited from North Africa—and increased the importance of the office of the vizier in the government. He also directed the construction of a series of strongholds in strategic positions throughout his frontiers, which formed the backbone of Granadan border defences in the centuries to come. He expanded the Alhambra palace and fortress complex, and increased the emirate's trade with Christian Europe, especially with traders from Genoa and Pisa. His epithet al-Faqih reflects his high education as well as his preference for surrounding himself with scholars and poets.

== Early life ==
Muhammad was born in 633 AH (1235 or 1236 CE) to the Nasrid clan, which originated from the town of Arjona, then in Al-Andalus on the Iberian Peninsula. According to the later Granadan historian and vizier Ibn al-Khatib, the clan—also known as Banu Nasr or Banu al-Ahmar—was descended from Sa'd ibn Ubadah, a prominent companion of the Islamic prophet Muhammad, from the Banu Khazraj tribe in Arabia; Sa'd's descendants migrated to Spain and settled in Arjona as farmers. He had at least two older brothers, Faraj (b. 628 AH/1230 or 1231 CE) and Yusuf, and two sisters named Mu'mina and Shams. In 1232, his father Muhammad I established the independence of the town, and it later grew to a sizeable independent state in the south of Spain, centred on Granada after the loss of Arjona in 1244. The Emirate of Granada became the last independent Muslim state in the Iberian peninsula. In 1257, after the death of Faraj, Muhammad I declared his sons Muhammad and Yusuf as his new heirs. On August of the same year, the younger Muhammad had his first son, the future Muhammad III. He had another son, Nasr, and a daughter, Fatima. Fatima would later marry his father's cousin Abu Said Faraj, and their descendants would be the future rulers of Granada, replacing the direct male line after the ousting of Nasr in 1314. As heir, the future Muhammad II was involved in matters of state, including war and diplomacy. He served as vizier for some time during his father's rule. He became the sole heir after the death of Yusuf, who did not leave a descendant, during their father's lifetime. By the time of his father's death in 1273, Muhammad II was aged 38 and an experienced statesman.

== Rule: 1273–1302 ==
=== Background ===
Map of the Nasrid Emirate of Granada. The frontiers changed over time and the map might not correspond to the territories held during a specific point of Muhammad II's rule. Green/pale yellow: Granada.

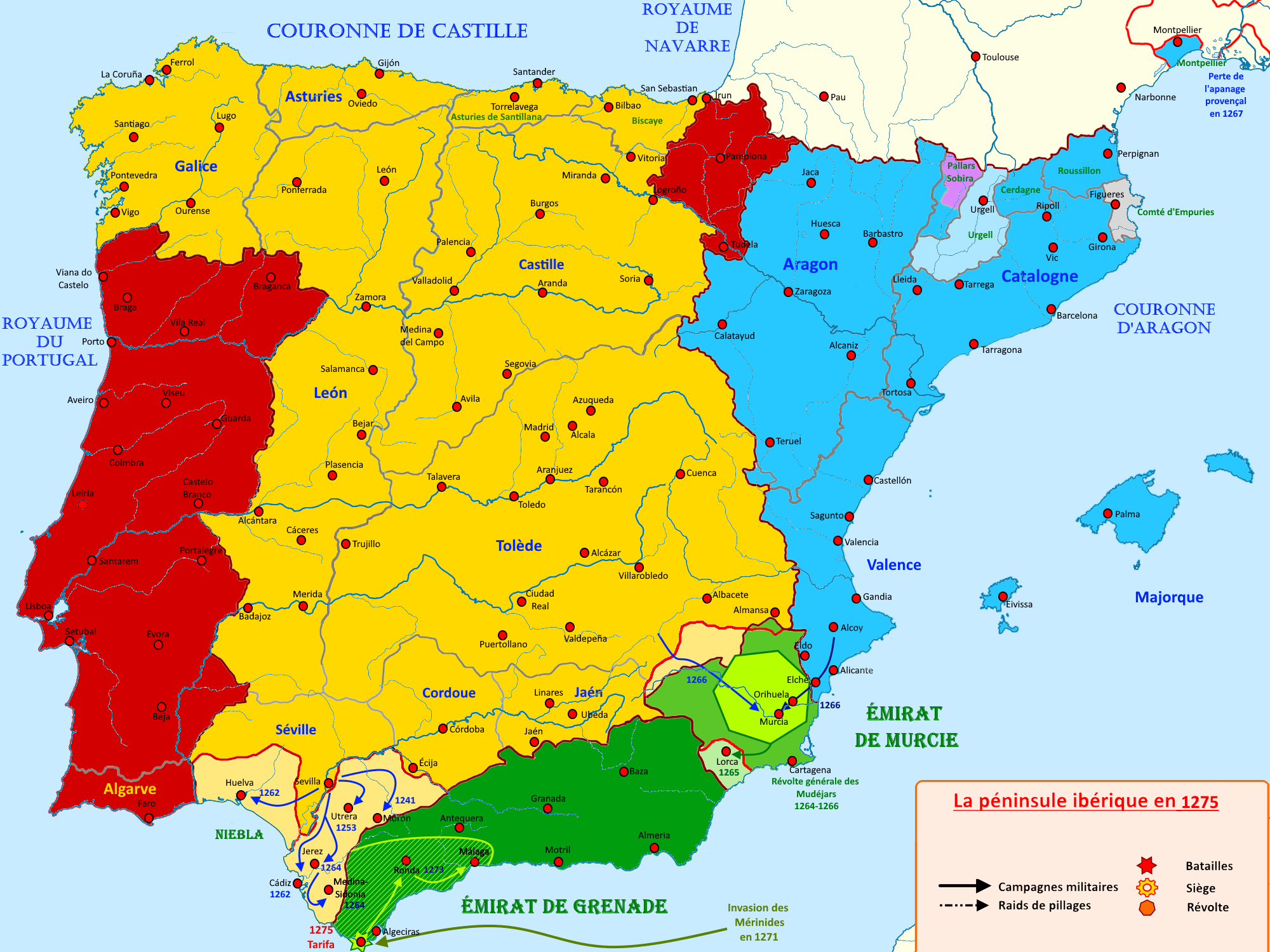
Granada (green) and its neighbours in 1275 (some placenames in French).

Granada was located between two larger neighbours: the Christian kingdom of Castile to the north and the Muslim Marinid state centred in today's Morocco to the south. Castile's objectives were to keep Granada in check, prevent it from conducting raids and force it to continue paying tribute. The tribute amount was 300,000 maravedís—about half of Granada's revenue—and represented an important source of income for Castile, though Granada often suspended payments. On the other hand, the Marinids, following in the footsteps of their Almohad and Almoravid predecessors, saw the protection of the Muslims in the Iberian peninsula, as well as participation in jihad against the Christian expansion there—the so-called "Reconquista"—as their duty as Muslims and as a way to increase their legitimacy. By the time of Muhammad II's rule, Granada's main objective was to maintain independence from both of these powers, preserve the balance of power, prevent an alliance between them, and control towns on the Castilian frontiers as well as ports on the Strait of Gibraltar, such as Algeciras, Tarifa, and Gibraltar. The contest over control of these strategically important ports, which controlled passage to and from North Africa, lasted until the mid-14th century, in what modern historians call the "Battle of the Strait" (Batalla del Estrecho).

Besides these two foreign powers, Granada was also challenged by the Banu Ashqilula, another Arjona clan which was initially allied with the Nasrids, and whose military strength had helped establish the kingdom. They rebelled against Muhammad I from at least 1266, and received assistance from Castile, then under the rule of Alfonso X, who wanted to keep Granada in check. Alfonso sent a force under Nuño González de Lara to help the Banu Ashqilula, but the Castilian nobleman had his own grievances against Alfonso; Nuño González ended up rebelling against his king, and was welcomed by Muhammad I. In the beginning of Muhammad II's rule, the Banu Ashqilula's territories included Málaga—the second biggest city in the emirate after Granada and an important Mediterranean port—as well as Guadix.

=== Accession and negotiation with Alfonso X ===
On 22 January 1273, Muhammad I fell from a horse and died of his injuries. The younger Muhammad took the throne as Muhammad II. As he was the designated heir, the transition of power went smoothly. His first order of business was to deal with the Banu Ashqilula rebellion and the Castilian rebels who had been allied to his father and welcomed in Granadan territories. Relations with the Castilian rebels, who were led by Nuño González and had been useful in checking both Castile and the Banu Ashqilula, weakened as both sides were concerned about losing each other's support after the succession. Alfonso was also interested in reconciling with some of the rebels.

Muhammad II then entered into negotiations with Alfonso—if he could secure Castile's alliance, he would not need to worry about losing the support of the rebels. In late 1273, he and some of the rebel leaders visited Alfonso at his court in Seville, where they were welcomed with honour. Alfonso agreed to Granada's demands—to end his support for the Banu Ashqilula—in exchange for Muhammad's promise to be Alfonso's vassal, to pay 300,000 maravedís each year in tribute, and to end his co-operation with the rebels. However, once the payment was made, Alfonso reneged on his part of the bargain, maintained his support for the Banu Ashqilula and pressed Muhammad to grant them a truce.

=== Marinid expeditions against Castile ===
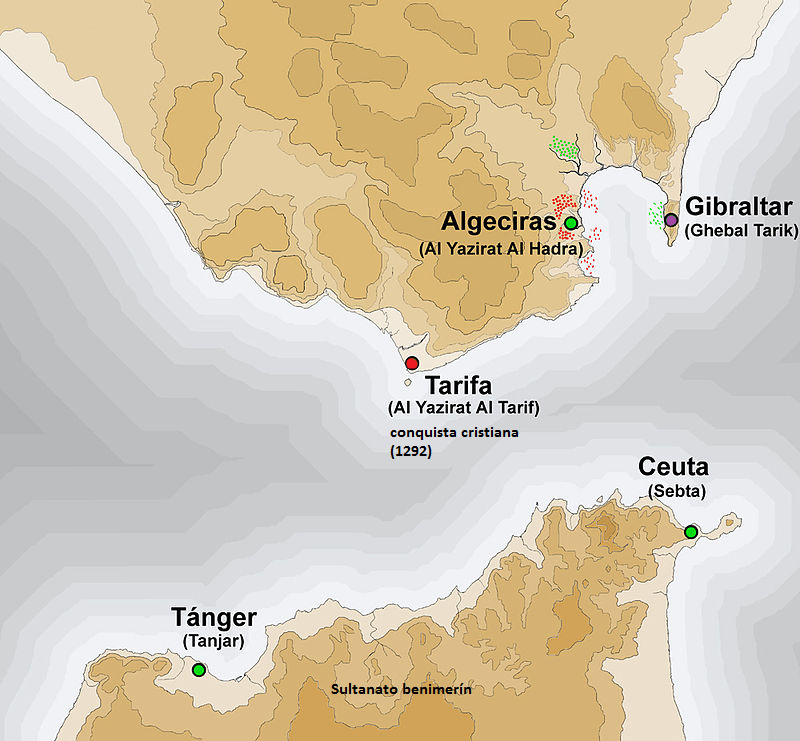
Principal ports on the Strait of Gibraltar, which controlled passage between North Africa and the Iberian Peninsula. Political control in 1292: Castile (red), Granada (purple), and the Marinids (green)

Frustrated by Alfonso, Muhammad sought help from the Marinids, ruled by Abu Yusuf Yaqub. While Alfonso was away on a journey to meet Pope Gregory X, leaving his realm under his heir and the regent Ferdinand de la Cerda, Muhammad sent envoys to the Marinid court. Abu Yusuf had expressed interest in fighting the Christians in Spain since 1245, and now, having gained control of the former Almohad capital of Marrakech and unified most of Morocco, he had the power and the opportunity to do so. In April 1275 Abu Yusuf mobilised an army which included 5,000 cavalry under the command of his son, Abu Zayyan Mandil. Three months later Abu Zayyan crossed the Strait of Gibraltar, landed at Tarifa and took over the town. Soon the governor of Algeciras seceded from Granada and yielded his town to Abu Zayyan. The Marinid prince established a beachhead between Tarifa and Algeciras, and began raiding Castilian territory up to Jerez. Amid the landings, Muhammad II attacked the Banu Ashqilula in Málaga on June 1275, but he was repulsed. Ferdinand de la Cerda marched to meet the Muslim forces, but he died on 25 July 1275 in Villareal, leaving Castile with uncertain leadership.

With the beachhead established and the Castilian territories reconnoitred, Abu Yusuf sent more troops across, including his own household troops, ministers, officials and North African clerics. Abu Yusuf himself crossed to Spain on 17 August 1275. He then met with Muhammad and the leader of the Banu Ashqilula, Abu Muhammad, who joined the Sultan with their armies. The Marinids treated the Nasrids and the Banu Ashqilula as equals, and Muhammad, offended at being seen as an equal to his rebellious subjects, left the army after three days, although his forces remained. In September 1275 this army won a major victory against Castile at the Battle of Ecija. Nuño González, now fighting for Castile, was killed. According to Marinid chronicles, the Banu Ashqilula contributed much to this victory and their leaders were present, while Granadan forces contributed little, with Muhammad himself staying in Granada.

Abu Zayyan celebrated the victory in Algeciras and sent the head of Nuño González to Granada. This probably offended Muhammad, who abhorred this type of cruelty and might have respected or even befriended his former ally. He embalmed the head in musk and camphor and sent it to Castile to be interred properly with his body. Marinid sources portrayed this as an attempt by Muhammad to "court [Alfonso's] friendship". At this point, the Marinids became more friendly with the Banu Ashqilula and less sympathetic towards Muhammad.

Who wants to repent to his Lord for his sins, follow the example of his Prophet, and be among the guided?
Who wants to purify his soul with a strong resolution to help the religion of Muhammad?
Or will you exalt the cities of the enemy lands, where God is never worshipped?
And will you humiliate the Muslim lands? Will you endure the insults of the trinitarians, oppressors of the believers of the One God?
That the mosques in this land have become churches! Be destroyed of grief, do not be insensitive!
The priests and the bells on top of the minaret; wine and pork in the mosque!
Alas! We no longer hear the prayers of the pious, who bowed down, who rose, and who prostrated themselves.
Instead we see a mob of reprobates, full of arrogance, who never in their lives profess the true faith.

— Excerpt of a poem by Muhammad II's secretary to the Marinid Sultan Abu Yusuf, appealing for his continued help in Al-Andalus.

After losing a naval battle off Tarifa, Abu Yusuf, wary of being cut off from Morocco, decided to return home. Abu Yusuf, Muhammad and Castile agreed to a two-year truce in late December 1275 or early January 1276. Before Abu Yusuf left, Muhammad's secretary Abu Umar ibn Murabit wrote a poem expressing fear of Castile's power and appealing for the Marinids' continued help (see box). Abu Yusuf left Spain and landed at Ksar es-Seghir on 19 January.

Abu Yusuf and the Marinids returned to Spain in June 1277. Initially they were joined by the Banu Ashqilula and campaigned without Muhammad and the Nasrid forces. The Marinids defeated the Castilian forces outside Seville on 2 August and took several castles along the Guadalquivir river before retiring to Algeciras on 29 August. Abu Yusuf marched again on 30 October, this time joined by Muhammad near Archidona. They took the castle of Benamejí, encircled Córdoba and pillaged the surrounding towns. Either Alfonso or the towns affected by the war sued for peace, which was accepted by Muhammad and Abu Yusuf. Abu Yusuf retired to Algeciras on 28 November, concluded a truce on 24 February 1278, and returned to Morocco in May. Although the Marinids had won a battlefield victory and the Muslim forces plundered multiple towns, they failed to take any major settlement or permanently annex Christian territories. On the other hands, the ports of Tarifa and Algeciras on the Strait, remained as the Marinids' outposts in the peninsula.

=== Diplomatic manoeuvring up to 1280 ===
During Abu Yusuf's second expedition, the Banu Ashqilula handed over Málaga—their centre of power—to their new ally. This action was motivated by the fear that they could not defend it against Granada. The Marinids occupied it in mid-February 1278, and Abu Yusuf appointed his uncle, Umar ibn Yahya, as governor. Muhammad was alarmed at this Marinid encroachment on his domain, reminiscent of the actions of the Almoravids and Almohads, two previous North African Muslim dynasties which had annexed Al-Andalus after initially intervening against the Christians. He encouraged Yaghmurasen of Tlemcen to attack the Marinids in North Africa, and Castile to attack the Marinids' Spanish base at Algeciras. Abu Yusuf, overstretched and attacked on multiple fronts, pulled back from Málaga and handed the city to Muhammad on 31 January 1279. It was also alleged that Granada bribed Umar ibn Yahya by giving him the castle of Salobreña and fifty thousand gold dinars. Muhammad named his cousin and close advisor Abu Said Faraj governor. With Málaga in his hands, Muhammad then helped the Marinids defend Algeciras, possibly feeling guilty about the sufferings of the besieged Muslims in the city. Joint Marinid–Granadan forces defeated the Castilian besiegers in 1279. Castilian sources at the time seemed not to realise the Granadan involvement and thought they were defeated solely by the Marinids.

=== War on two fronts ===
The manoeuvring that saw the gain of Málaga and prevented Castile from taking Algeciras angered both the Marinids and Castile. Both, together with the Banu Ashqilula, attacked Muhammad in 1280. The Marinids and Banu Ashqilula moved towards Málaga, unsuccessfully attacking the region of Marbella in the south. Castile attacked from the north, led by the infante (prince) Sancho (later Sancho IV), son of Alfonso, who was checked by the North African Volunteers of the Faith led by Ibn Muhalli and Tashufin ibn Mu'ti. The Volunteers were a component of Granada's military made up of warriors from North Africa, largely political exiles who migrated with their families and tribes. They still defended Granada against Castile despite Granada also being at war with the Marinid state which they came from. On 23 June, Granadan troops ambushed a large Castilian force at Moclín. In June 1281, Castile invaded again, led by Alfonso himself and accompanied by the Infantes Sancho, Peter and John. They defeated Muhammad in a battle near Granada's walls on 25 June, but after the failure of the negotiations that followed, the Castilians left Granada.

At the end of 1281, Alfonso sent Sancho to Granada for further negotiations and Muhammad agreed to renew his vassalage to Castile. However, Alfonso accused Sancho of acting treacherously and of appropriating Muhammad's tribute. A rift broke out between the king and his son, which weakened the Castilian threat to Granada. Alfonso ended up asking for Abu Yusuf's help against Sancho, and the two monarchs campaigned together against Sancho's partisans in Castile. Meanwhile, Muhammad sealed an alliance with Sancho at Priego in late 1282. At the end of 1283, Abu Yusuf attacked Málaga, forcing Muhammad to sue for peace. Mediated by Abu Yusuf's son, Abu Yaqub Yusuf, they agreed to reconcile and attack the Christians together.

Alfonso died in 1284, and was succeeded by Sancho. Sancho was friendly towards Granada and pulled back the Castilian troops, while Muhammad declared his vassalage to him. In 1286 Abu Yusuf died and was succeeded by his son Abu Yaqub. At the beginning of his reign Abu Yaqub was more preoccupied with domestic affairs, and so withdrew his forces from the Iberian campaign. In 1288 Abu Yaqub offered the Banu Ashqilula lands in North Africa. The clan took up the offer and emigrated en masse from Granadan territory.

=== Tarifa campaigns ===
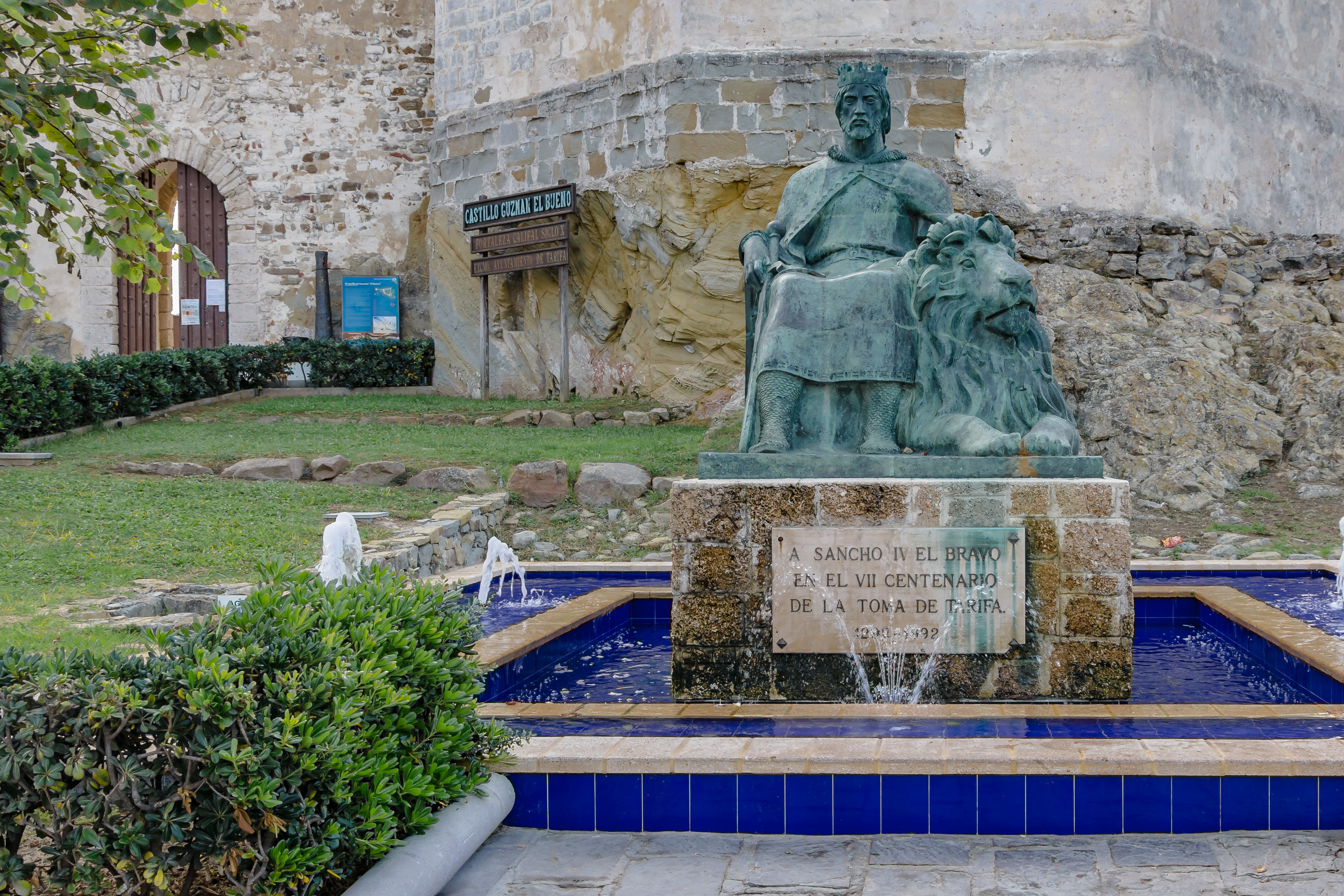
Muhammad II helped Sancho IV take Tarifa from the Marinids, but the Castilian king then refused to yield the town to Muhammad as promised. Picture: A statue commemorating Sancho's taking of Tarifa.

The Marinids retained outposts in Iberia, including Tarifa, an important port town on the Strait of Gibraltar. In 1290, Muhammad came to an arrangement with Sancho and the ruler of Tlemcen. Castile would attack Tarifa, Granada would attack other Marinid possessions, and Tlemcen would open hostilities against the Marinids in North Africa. According to the agreement, Castile would then hand Tarifa to Granada in exchange for six border fortresses. In November and December 1291, James II of Aragon met Sancho and agreed to join the war against the Marinids. In October 1292 Castile, with assistance from Aragon's navy and supplied by Granada, succeeded in taking Tarifa. Castile also took the six border fortresses from Granada as agreed, but refused to cede Tarifa even after Muhammad met with Sancho in Córdoba in December. Granada, feeling cheated, then switched sides to the Marinids. Muhammad travelled to North Africa and met Abu Ya'qub at Tangier on 24 October, bearing many gifts and asking his friendship and forgiveness. Both monarchs agreed to an alliance against Castile. In 1294, the Marinids and Granada unsuccessfully besieged Tarifa. The town would never again be in Muslim hands. After this failure, the Marinids decided to withdraw to North Africa. Granada proceeded to retake its former outposts, including Algeciras and—after some local resistance—Ronda.

=== Final years and death ===
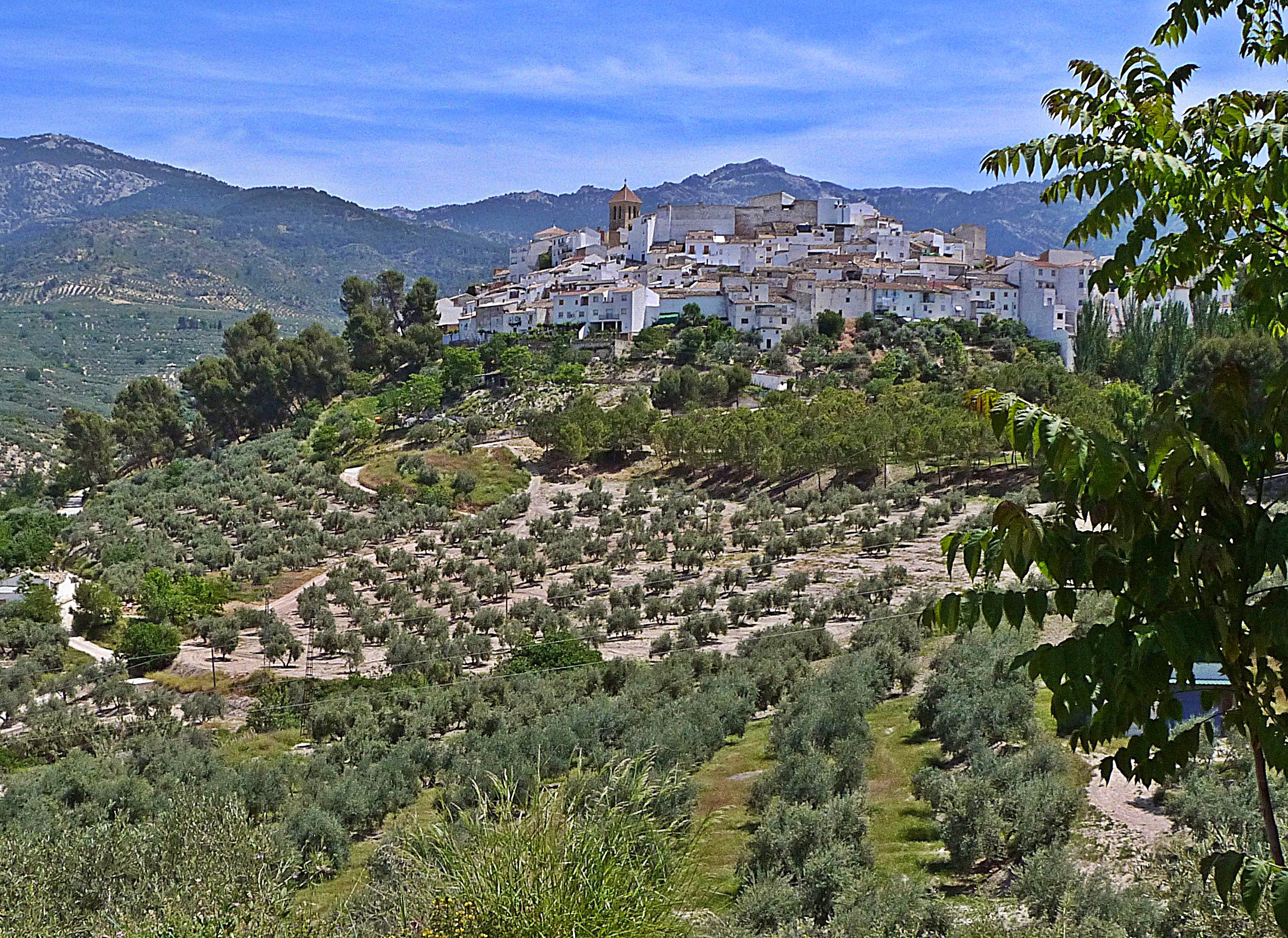
Quesada, captured by Muhammad in 1295 and one of Granada's territorial gains during his reign.

In 1295, Sancho died and was succeeded by his nine-year-old son Ferdinand IV. During his minority Castile was governed by a regency led by his uncle, Infante Henry. His cousin, Alfonso de la Cerda made a rival claim for the throne, supported by James of Aragon. Muhammad exploited this situation to strike at Castile: in late 1295 he captured Quesada and routed a Castilian army at the Battle of Iznalloz. Ferdinand was also attacked by Aragon, Denis of Portugal, and his uncle, Infante John. In 1296, Granada and Aragon concluded a pact of friendship and agreed to split their objectives: Murcia would go to Aragon and Andalusia to Granada. In June 1296, Infante Henry made peace overtures to Muhammad, offering to hand over Tarifa, but this broke down when the town's commander, Alfonso Pérez de Guzmán, declared that he would not hand it over even if ordered to do so. Late that year, Granadan forces defeated Infante Henry near Arjona and nearly captured him. Henry's horse was captured, but Muhammad ordered it returned in a gesture of chivalry.

The Marinids joined the war to support Granada and defeated Castile in a major battle near Seville in May or June 1299; they then laid siege to Tarifa. Castile renewed the offer to yield Tarifa in exchange for an alliance with Granada, but this was again frustrated by Alfonso Pérez's refusal to comply. The war continued and Muhammad took more border fortresses, including Alcaudete in June 1299, and raided Castilian cities including Jaén and Andújar. In April 1301, Muhammad and James renewed their alliance, although James secretly sent supplies to the besieged Christians in Tarifa. On 6 September, Pope Boniface VIII declared Ferdinand the legitimate king of Castile, weakening the resolve and legitimacy of his Christian enemies. In September 1301, Granada and Aragon renewed their alliance at Zaragoza. They planned a new offensive against Castile and aligned their war goals; among others they agreed that Granada was to regain Tarifa and acquire several frontier towns. This agreement was ratified in January 1302, and subsequently Alfonso de la Cerda also joined the alliance and recognised Muhammad's rights to Tarifa. However, before the campaign started, Muhammad II died on 8 April 1302 (8 Shaban 701 AH). He was succeeded by his son, Muhammad III. There were allegations that Muhammad III, perhaps impatient to assume power, had poisoned his father, although this was never confirmed.

== Governance and legacy ==
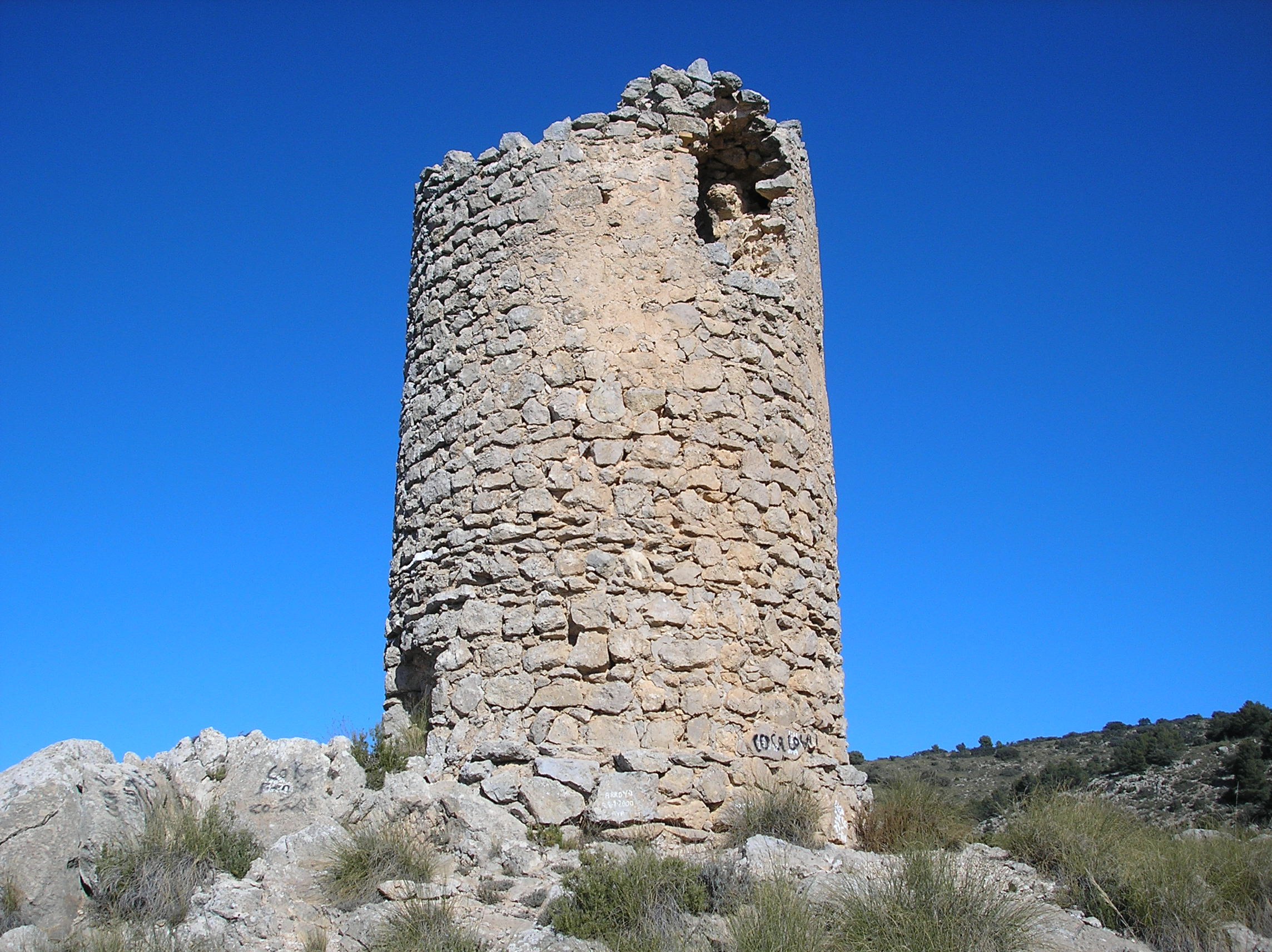
A Nasrid-era watchtower in Huéscar. Muhammad II built a line of fortifications on the emirate's frontiers.

Muhammad built on the nascent state created by his father, and continued to secure his realm's independence by alternatively allying with other powers, especially Castile and the Marinids, and sometimes encouraging them to fight each other. A sense of identity also emerged in the realm, united by religion (Islam), language (Arabic), and an awareness of an ever-present threat to its survival from its Romance-speaking Christian neighbours. Historian Ibn Khaldun commented that these ties served as a replacement for asabiyyah or tribal solidarity, which Ibn Khaldun thought was fundamental to the rise and fall of a state.

Muhammad II was the true organiser of the Nasrid state with his reforms to the administration and the army. His considerable legislative activity included the institution of the Nasrid royal protocol (rusūm al-mulk), and of the court chancery (al-kitāba), in which the chief figure of his reign was the future vizier Abu Abdallah ibn al-Hakim. His reign also saw the expansion and institutionalisation of the Volunteers of the Faith (also called ghazis in Arabic): soldiers recruited from North Africa to defend Granada against the Christians. Many of them were members of tribes or families which had been exiled from the Marinid state. Some of them settled in the city of Granada, establishing the quarter of Zenete (named after the Berber tribe of Zenata), and some in the western areas of the realm, such as Ronda and the surrounding area. They received payments from the state, but often came into conflict with the locals in the areas they settled. When, in the early 1280s, Granada came into conflict with the Marinids, the Volunteers remained loyal and defended Granada against Castile, when it attacked at the same time. Over time, the Volunteers became Granada's most important military force, numbering 10,000 at the end of Muhammad's rule and eclipsing Granada's locally recruited army. Their leader, the shaikh al-ghuzat, held an influential position in Granadan politics. Different men were named as the shaikh by Muhammad at different points of his reign, including Ali ibn Abi Iyad ibn Abd al-Haqq, Tasfin ibn Mu'ti, Musa ibn Rahhu, Abd al-Haqq ibn Rahhu, and Ibrahim ibn Yahya.

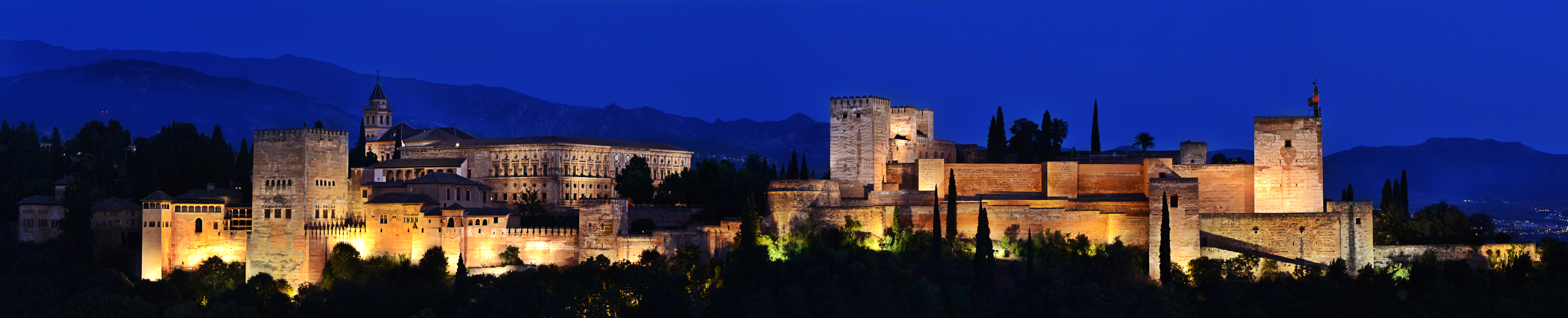
During his reign, Muhammad II steadily transformed the Alhambra from being largely a fortress to being a royal palace complex.

Territorially, Muhammad consolidated his realm and gained several strongholds in the Kingdom of Jaén, including Quesada and Alcaudete. He lost Tarifa to Castile, and from this point the town would never again be in Muslim hands. The internal threat from the Banu Ashqilula was eliminated, and Muhammad not only saw off successfully the repeated Marinid attacks, but deprived them of their holdings in Al-Andalus as well. Muhammad oversaw a large-scale fortification project for the kingdom's defences, building a series of strategically positioned and well-supplied strongholds from the west to the east, which formed the backbone of Granadan frontier defences in the centuries to come. He worked with his own hands during the constructions of the moat (khandaq) in Alcaudete. The fortifications that he built also served to enforce royal authority because they were controlled by military governors (qa'ids) appointed and rotated by the court rather than by hereditary lords. They were often located in mountainous or other areas that were difficult to reach, and could only be conquered or breached by expensive siege warfare.

Muhammad increased the importance of the vizier in the Nasrid state. He had only one vizier throughout his long reign, Abu Sultan Aziz ibn Ali ibn al-Mun'im al-Dani, who became his trusted ally. He also served as Muhammad's ambassador to the Marinids, commanded some military operations, and co-signed many royal documents. Muhammad also expanded the Alhambra, steadily establishing a royal residence zone in what was largely a fortress complex built by his father. He continued his father's constructions of a precinct wall surrounding the royal zone, as well as multiple residence buildings and bathhouses. The chronology for each part of the Alhambra during the early Nasrid period is not always clear—partly due to alterations and renovations under later Muslim or Christian rulers—but Muhammad II definitely built the original palace that today becomes the Convent of San Francisco as well as the original Dar al-Mamlaka al-Saida in the Generalife. He also built the Tower of the Ladies (Torre de las Damas, the site of today's Partal Palace built by his son Muhammad III) and the Tower of the Points (Torre de los Picos). Further afield, the Nasrid palace structure now known as the Cuarto Real de Santo Domingo, located on along the edge of what was Granada's southern walls, has been dated by scholars to his reign as well.

Externally, Muhammad pursued an increase in trade with Christian Europe, especially with Italian traders from Genoa and Pisa. On 18 April 1279, Muhammad concluded a treaty with the ambassador of Genoa, granting the republic the rights to export Granadan goods with an especially low fee of 6.5% and to establish a trading post in the emirate, in exchange for supplying ships to Granada in the event of conflict against another Muslim power not allied to Genoa.

Muhammad II was known by the epithet al-Faqih, literally meaning "the canon-lawyer", but which can also be understood as "the Wise", and reflects not only his high education, but also his preference for surrounding himself with scholars and poets. Much like his contemporary, King Alfonso X of Castile, Muhammad wrote poetry—he was a decent poet himself according to Ibn al-Khatib—and fostered significant cultural activity at his court. He competed with Alfonso in attracting learned men, especially Muslim men of science from territories conquered by the Christians. Among those he welcomed to his court were the mathematician-physician Muhammad al-Riquti and the astronomer-mathematician Muhammad ibn al-Raqqam, who migrated to Granada despite being offered substantial payments by Alfonso if they were to convert and stay in Christian territory. The Spanish historian Ana Isabel Carrasco Manchado writes, "al-Faqih is an unusual sobriquet among Andalusi rulers; it underlined a political personality that intended to affirm itself through association with intellectual practice and with the faith, as well as with justice and legal norms, facets which overlap in the activity of the faqihs".

Muhammad II of Granada Nasrid dynasty Cadet branch of the Banu Khazraj Born: c. 1235 Died: 8 April 1302
Regnal titles
Preceded by Muhammad I	Sultan of Granada; 1273–1302	Succeeded by Muhammad III
