= 1274 in France =

- Decades: 1250s; 1260s; 1270s; 1280s; 1290s
- See also: History of France; Timeline of French history; List of years in France

Events from the year 1274 in France.

== Incumbents ==
- Monarch - Philip III

== Events ==
- 19 February - Comtat Venaissin in southern France was ceded to the Papal States.
- 7 May to 17 July - The Second Council of Lyon was held.
- 21 August - Philip III married Marie of Brabant.

=== Full date unknown ===
- Philip III acquired the Lordship of Nemours from the house of Villebéon.
- Construction of Niederhaslach Church was started.
- Construction of Coutances Cathedral was complete.
- Oldest surviving copy of Grandes Chroniques de France was presented to the French monarch.

== Births ==
- 9 February - Louis of Toulouse, French archbishop and Catholic saint (died 1297)

== Deaths ==
- 8 August - Eudes de Lorris, French bishop (birth date unknown)
- 12 August - Olivier de Termes, French knight (born 1200)
- 15 August - Robert de Sorbon, French theologian (born 1201)
- 1 September - Douceline of Digne, French nun and Beguines of Marseille (born 1215)

=== Full date unknown ===
- Hugh IV of Rodez, Count of Rodez (born 1212)
