= Muhammad al-Riquti =

Muslim scholar and physician

Abu Bakr Muhammad ibn Ahmad al-Riquti al-Mursi (أبو بكر محمد بن أحمد بن الرقوطي, also spelled Abubequer Mohamed ibn Ahmed Al-Ricotí) was a 13th-century Muslim scholar and physician from Murcia. He founded and led a school where he taught Muslims, Christians, and Jews, under the patronage of Alfonso the Wise. Later, he migrated to the Emirate of Granada at the invitation of Sultan Muhammad II.

== Biography ==
Al-Riquti was from the city of Murcia (hence his nisba al-Mursi), and according to historian Ibn al-Khatib (1313–1375) he was an expert in logic, mathematics, arithmetic, music, and medicine. He spoke Arabic and the local Romance language, and possibly Latin and Hebrew as well. Murcia was formerly the seat of small Muslim kingdom and also an intellectual center, which was conquered by Castile in 1243 and became a semi-independent protectorate. The Castilian prince Alfonso (the future Alfonso X of Castile) allowed al-Riquti to found a school and teach Muslims, Christians, and Jews alike. Ibn al-Khatib wrote that al-Riquti taught the three religious groups "in their own languages", and described this school as a "madrasa". Several modern historians hypothesize that it might be the Studia Linguarum of the Dominicans in Murcia. The modern University of Murcia considered this school as one of the university's forerunners. While most historians assume that al-Riquti's school was located in Murcia, the historian Gerard Albert Wiegers instead identifies it with a Estudio general built by Alfonso in Seville in 1254.

Alfonso X became king in 1252 and adopted the policy of encouraging Muslim scholars to stay in conquered formerly Muslim territories and offering rewards for those who converted to Christianity. Meanwhile, Muslims in Murcia rebelled in 1264, and after it was defeated by the royal forces in 1266 the region lost its autonomy. Many Muslim intellectuals lost their privileges; al-Riquti felt anxious about the situation and about Alfonso's encouragement to convert to Christianity. Meanwhile, in 1273 Muhammad II became the Sultan of Granada, the last Muslim state of Spain. He was known as al-Faqih ("the canon lawyer") and competed with Alfonso in attracting learned men to his emirate. Al-Riquti migrated to Granada at the Sultan's instigation. In Granada he was involved in a number of debates, and he held a respectable position until he died.

== Bibliography ==
- Samsó, Julio (1981). "Dos colaboradores científicos musulmanes de Alfonso X" (PDF). Llull: Revista de la Sociedad Española de Historia de las Ciencias y de las Técnicas. 4 (6–7): 171–180. ISSN 0210-8615.
- Urvoy, Dominique (1992). "The Ulama of al-Andalus". In Salma Khadra Jayyusi; Manuela Marín (eds.). The Legacy of Muslim Spain. Brill. pp. 849–877. ISBN 90-04-09599-3.
- Vernet, Juan; Samsó, Julio (1996). "The development of Arabic science in Andalusia". In Roshdi Rashed (ed.). Encyclopedia of the History of Arabic Science. Routledge. pp. 243–275. ISBN 978-0-415-12410-2. OCLC 912501823.
- Wiegers, Gerard (1994). Islamic Literature in Spanish and Aljamiado: Yça of Segovia (fl. 1450), His Antecendents and Successors. Brill. ISBN 90-04-09936-0.
