= 1268 in France =

- Decades: 1240s; 1250s; 1260s; 1270s; 1280s
- See also: History of France; Timeline of French history; List of years in France

1268 in France included the following events in French history:

== Births ==
- Philip IV of France was born.
