= Cuarto Real de Santo Domingo =

Historic building in Granada, Spain

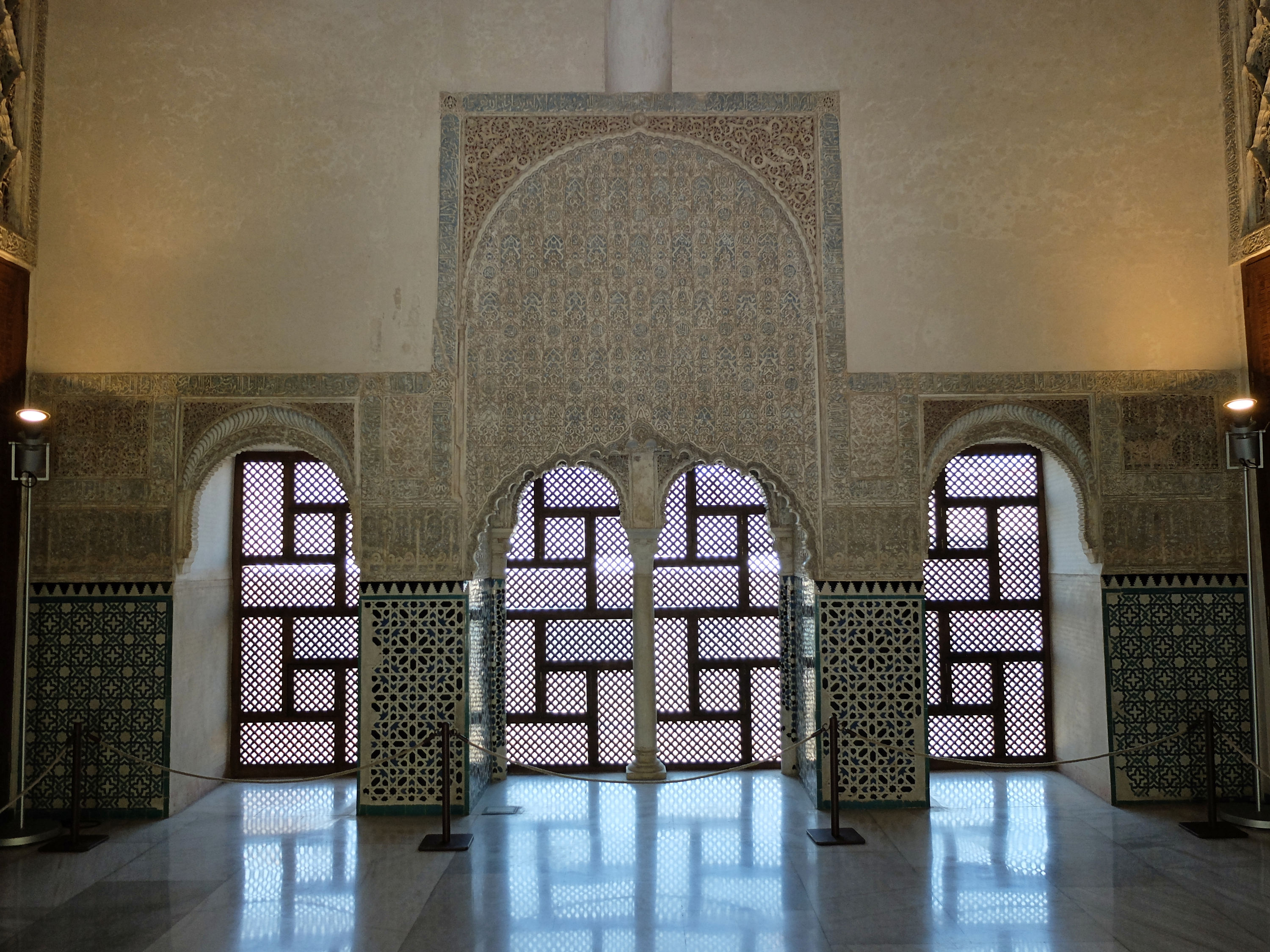
- Interior of the main hall
- Interactive map of the Cuarto Real de Santo Domingo area
- Former names: Dar al-Manjara al-Kubra

General information
- Type: Palace
- Architectural style: Nasrid, Moorish
- Coordinates: 37°10′17.3″N 3°35′41.8″W
- Completed: between 1283 and 1302

The Cuarto Real de Santo Domingo is a former Nasrid palace and convent in Granada, Spain. It is located in the Realejo quarter of the city.

== History ==
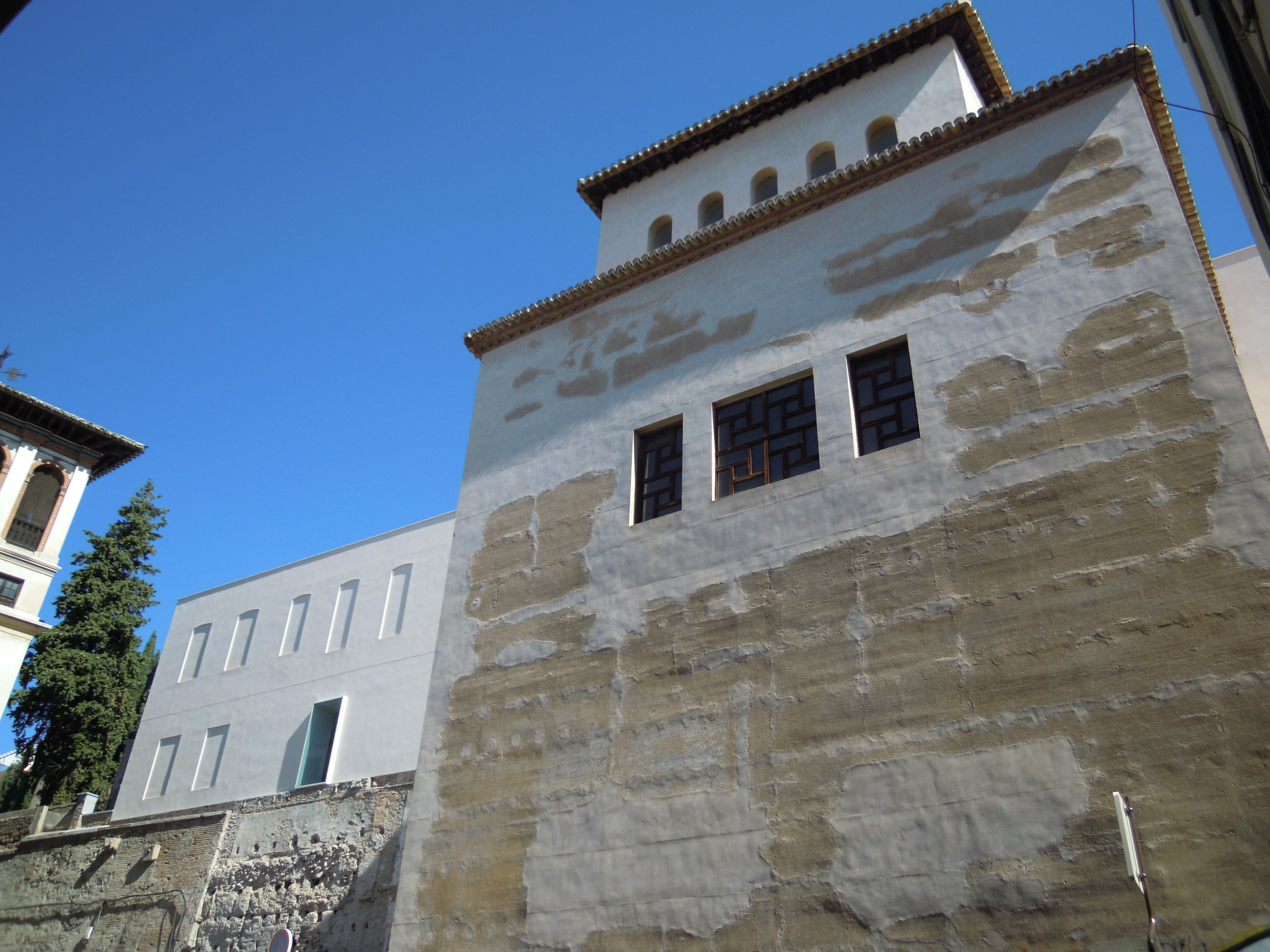
The exterior of the main hall (seen from the south), which was built on top of a tower of the former city walls

The original construction of the palace is believed to date from the reign of Muhammad II (ruled 1273–1302) and a recent dendrochronological study has dated the wooden ceiling to after 1283. This makes it one of the earliest surviving palace structures built by the Nasrid dynasty. It was originally known as the Dar al-Manjara al-Kubra ("House of the Great Wooden Wheel") or Jannat al-Manjara al-Kubra ("Garden of the Great Wooden Wheel"). Located on the edge of the city walls, it was used as a royal country estate residence by the Nasrid dynasty, probably for short visits. Its style shows similarities to later Nasrid buildings and to other buildings built under the Zayyanids and Marinids in North Africa in the same period, suggesting that the same craftsmen may have worked for different patrons across the region.

After the conquest of Granada by the Catholic Monarchs in 1492, the palace became part of the Dominican convent of Santa Cruz and the main hall became known as the Royal Hall of Santo Domingo (Cuarto Real de Santo Domingo). At one time it was occupied by Tomás de Torquemada, the first Grand Inquisitor of Inquisition. The structure was declared a site of Cultural Interest in 1919. Since 1990 it has been owned by the city of Granada. It was then restored under the direction of Antonio Almagro Gorbea and Antonio Orihuela.

== Architecture ==
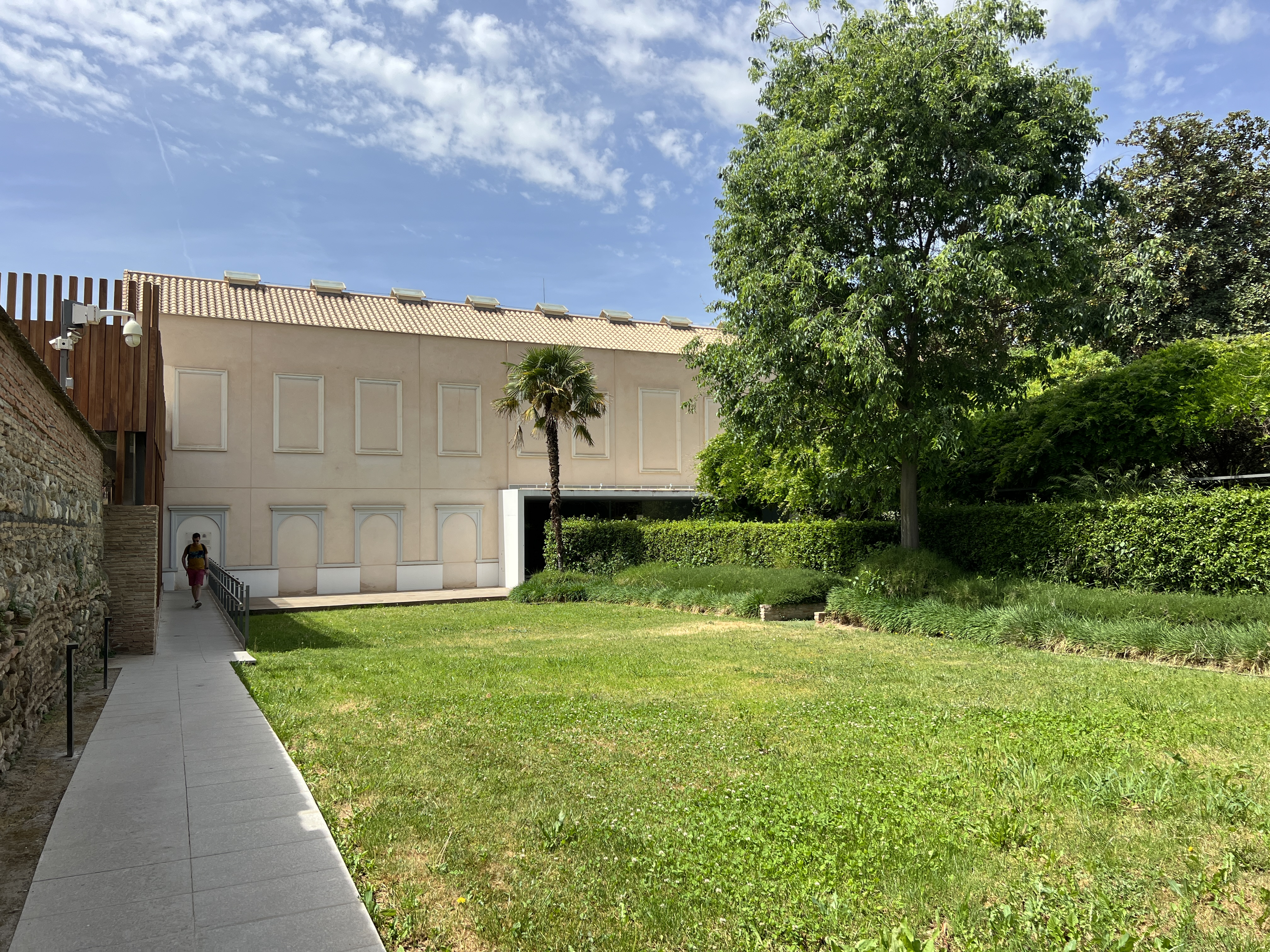
Exterior of the building today, seen from the gardens on the northwest side

The structure today consists mainly of a large square hall, measuring approximately 6 meters per side. The hall overlooks the Plaza de los Campos below on the southwest and is built on top of a bastion tower which was formerly part of the city walls. The tower itself was enlarged in order to serve as foundation for the hall. The walls protected the Alfareros ("Potters") suburb of the city, now corresponding to the Realejo neighbourhood. The palace was thus built on the edge of the city and was essentially a country estate, originally of much larger size than what remains today. The estate and its gardens would have been enclosed by their own walls to preserve the privacy of its royal owners.

The main hall is flanked by three side chambers and alcoves on either side. This layout is very similar to the original layout of the Alcázar Genil, a nearby Nasrid country estate to the southwest. The hall is richly decorated, with zellij tiles along the lower walls, the upper walls covered with carved stucco, and a large pyramidal and coffered wooden ceiling with geometric motifs. The back wall is pierced by three large windows, set into deep alcoves within the thick walls, starting at ground level. The windows would have offered an uninterrupted view over the Genil River. All these decorative features were subsequently standard in Andalusi and Maghrebi architecture across the region, demonstrating that many of the architectural traditions of the era were already established by this point. The design of the hall, including its integration into an existing defensive tower, is also reminiscent of the larger and later Hall of the Ambassadors in the Comares Palace of the Alhambra.

The main hall was originally fronted on the outside by a five-arched portico, but this was dismantled in the 19th century. In the middle of this portico was a small floor fountain whose water trickled into a large octagonal pool in front of the portico, unlike later Nasrid palaces which featured a large rectangular pool. Excavations have revealed that the rest of the space in front of the building was occupied by a large rectangular garden, divided symmetrically in two by a central walkway. The flowerbeds on either side were planted with myrtles and orange trees.

Main hall

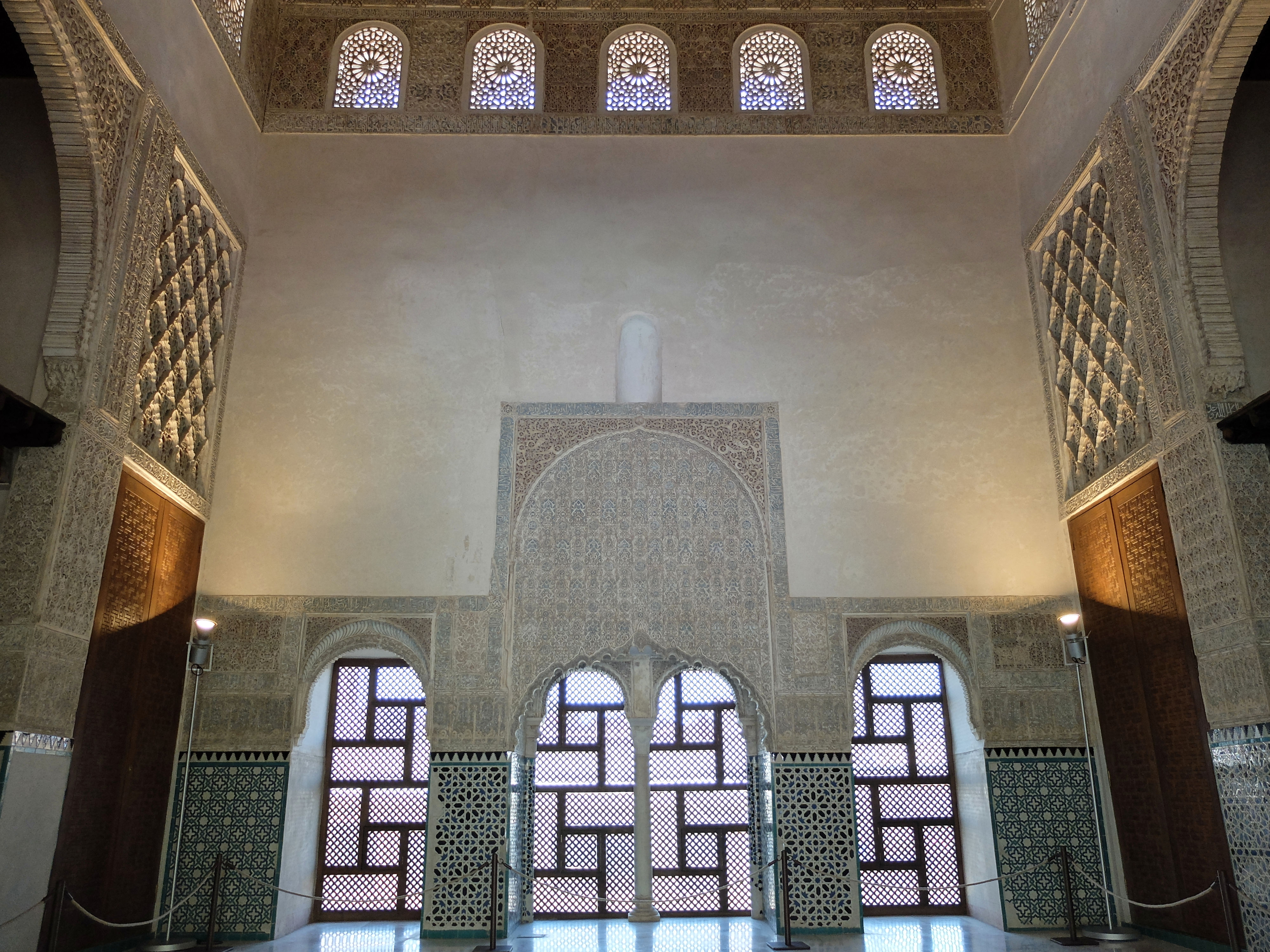
The main hall, looking from the entrance towards the back

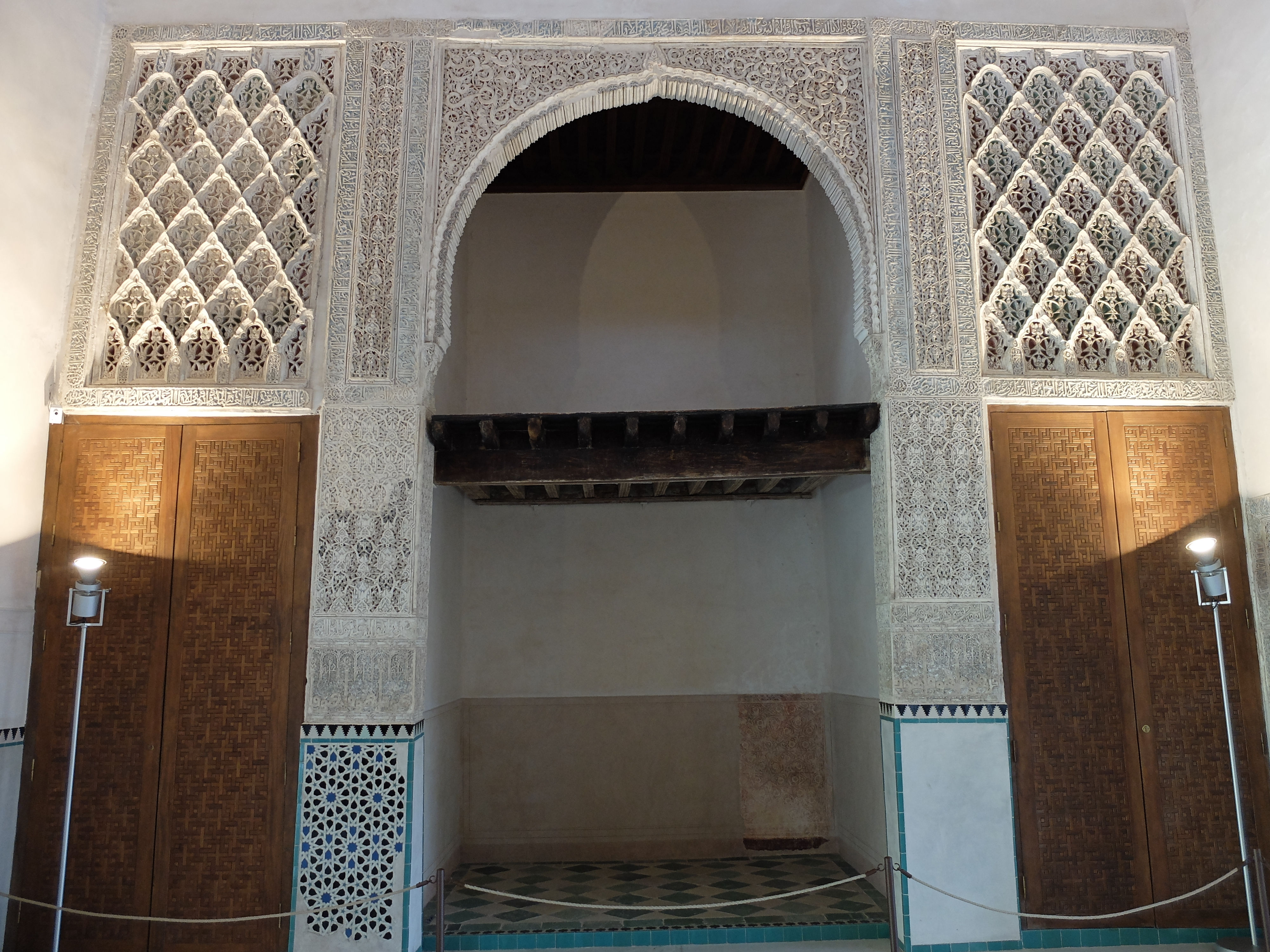
One of the sides of the main hall, with its three alcoves or side rooms

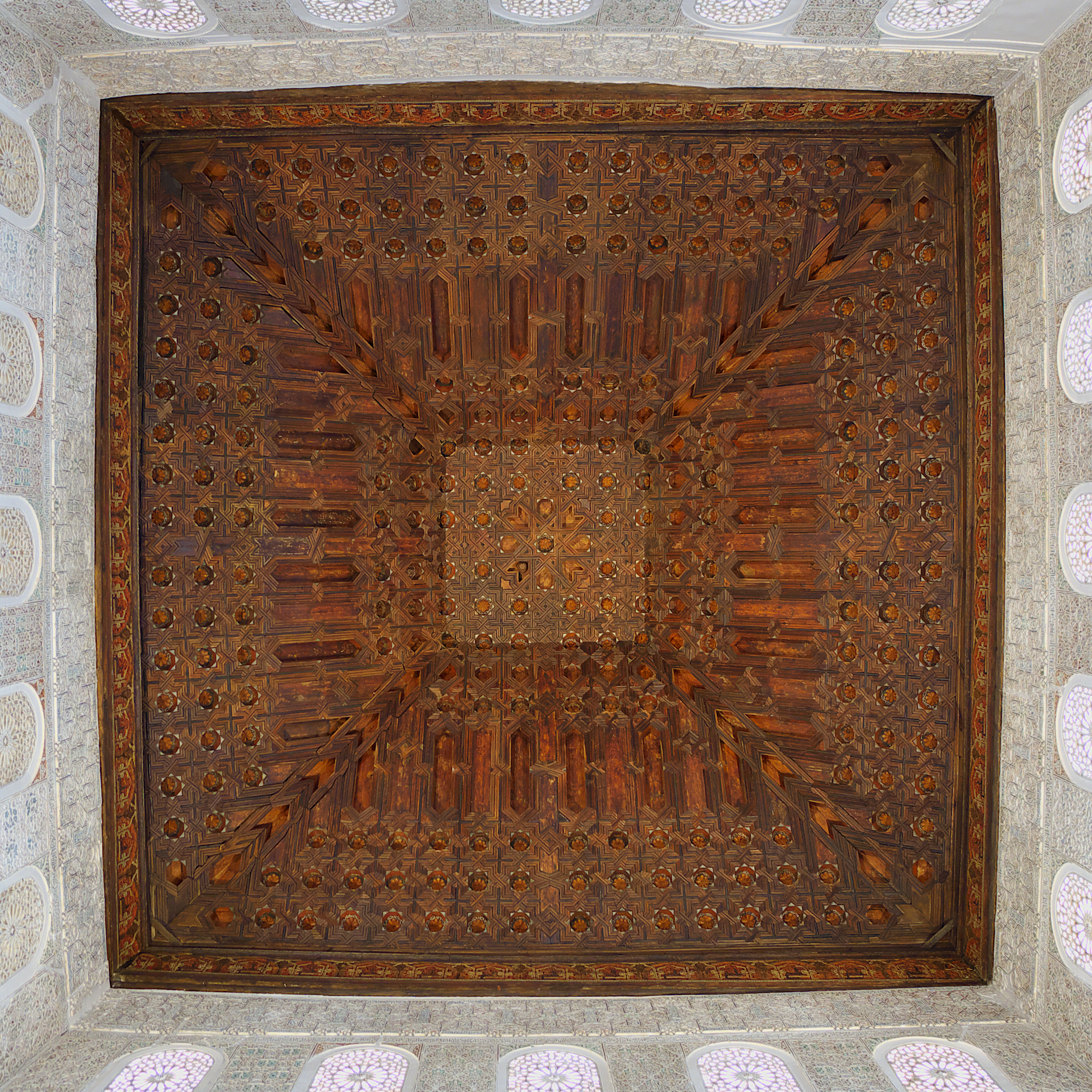
Wooden ceiling of the main hall

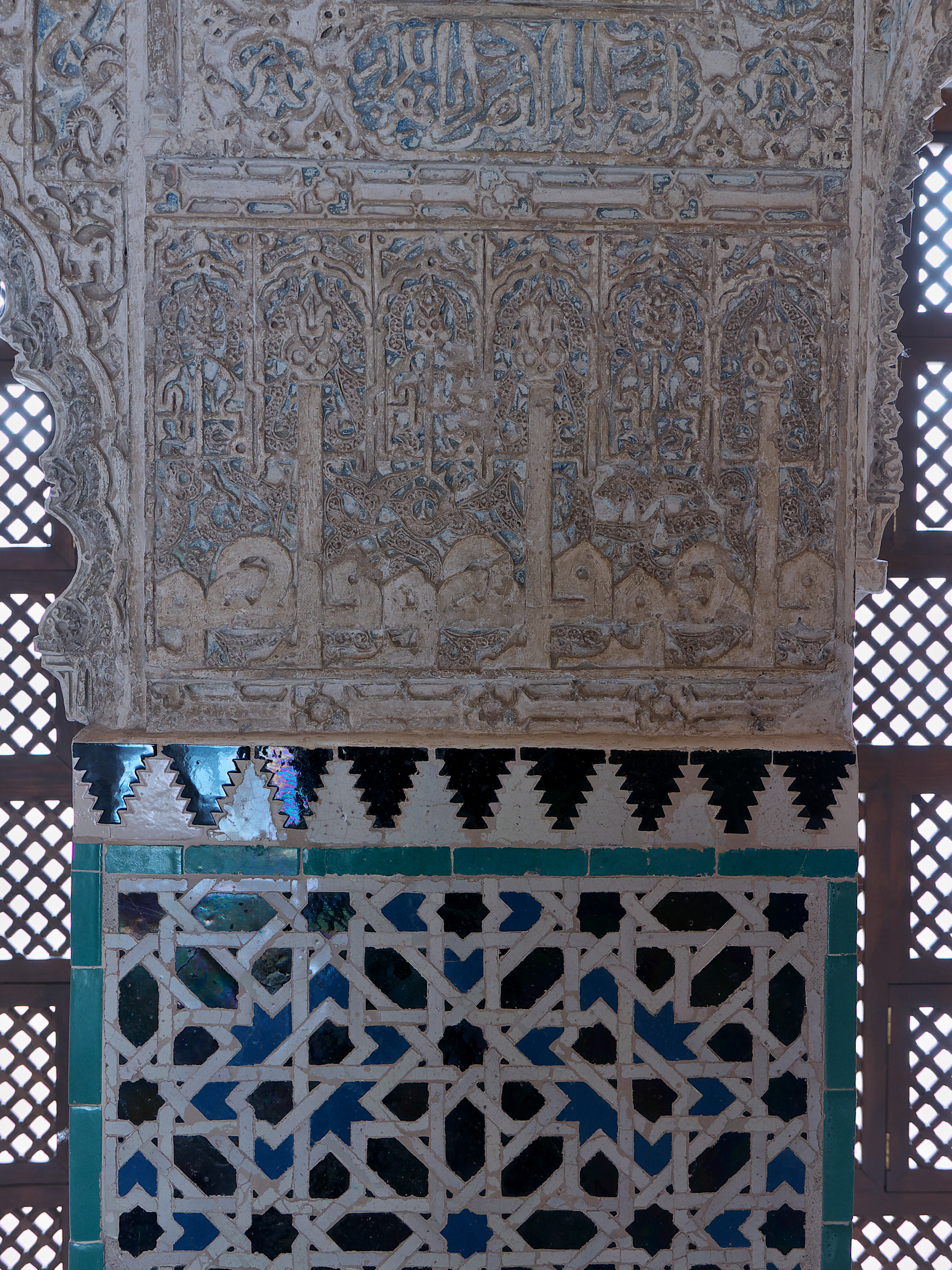
Details of decoration in the main hall: carved stucco above and zellij tiles below

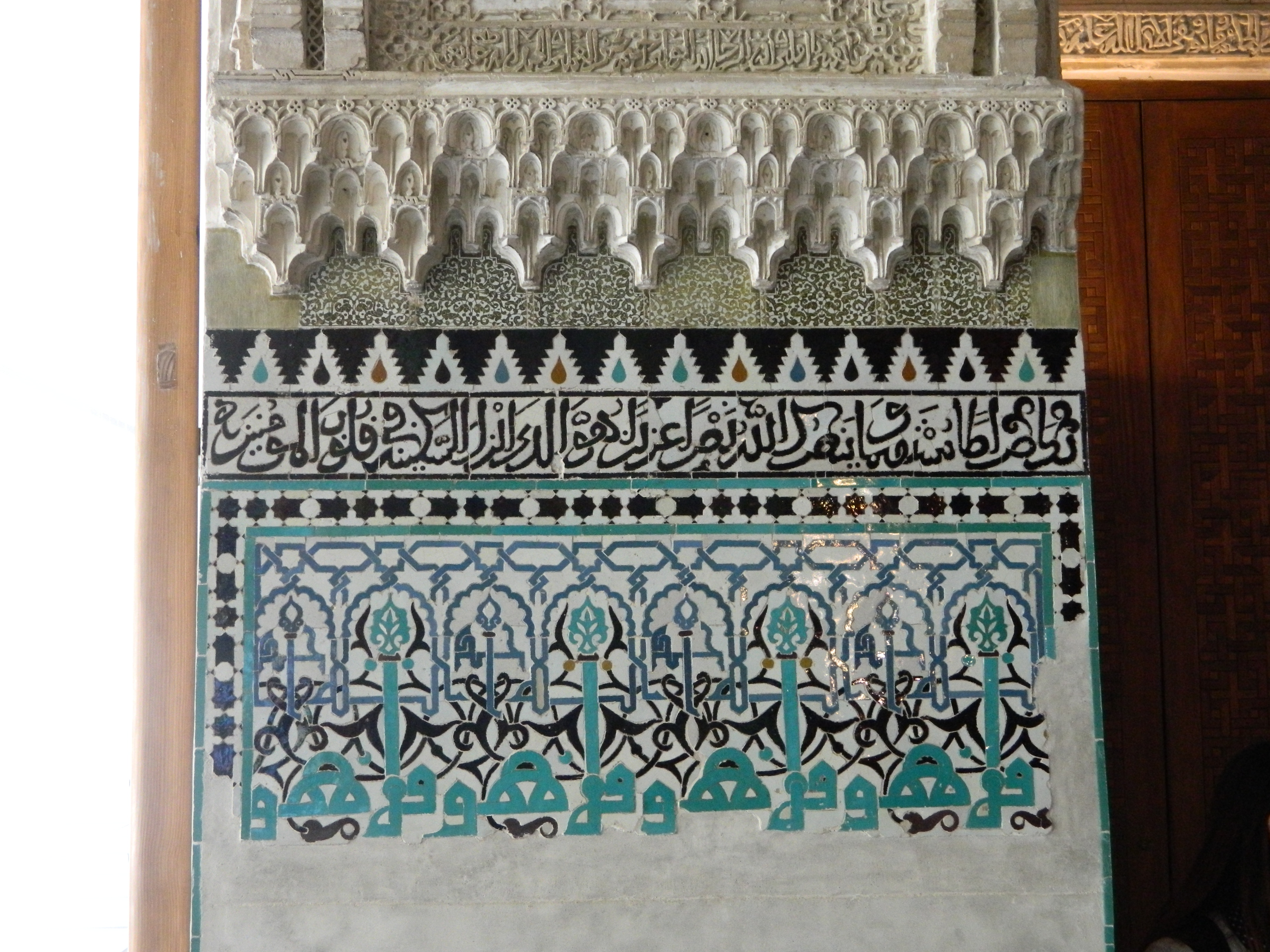
Decoration of the entrance archway: muqarnas carved in stucco (above), with mosaic tilework (below) featuring calligraphic inscriptions and motifs
