= 1273 =

1273 in various calendars
- Gregorian calendar: 1273; MCCLXXIII
- Ab urbe condita: 2026
- Armenian calendar: 722; ԹՎ ՉԻԲ
- Assyrian calendar: 6023
- Balinese saka calendar: 1194–1195
- Bengali calendar: 679–680
- Berber calendar: 2223
- English Regnal year: 1 Edw. 1 – 2 Edw. 1
- Buddhist calendar: 1817
- Burmese calendar: 635
- Byzantine calendar: 6781–6782
- Chinese calendar: 壬申年 (Water Monkey); 3970 or 3763 — to — 癸酉年 (Water Rooster); 3971 or 3764
- Coptic calendar: 989–990
- Discordian calendar: 2439
- Ethiopian calendar: 1265–1266
- Hebrew calendar: 5033–5034
- Hindu calendars
- Vikram Samvat: 1329–1330
- Shaka Samvat: 1194–1195
- Kali Yuga: 4373–4374
- Holocene calendar: 11273
- Igbo calendar: 273–274
- Iranian calendar: 651–652
- Islamic calendar: 671–672
- Japanese calendar: Bun'ei 10 (文永１０年)
- Javanese calendar: 1183–1184
- Julian calendar: 1273; MCCLXXIII
- Korean calendar: 3606
- Minguo calendar: 639 before ROC 民前639年
- Nanakshahi calendar: −195
- Thai solar calendar: 1815–1816
- Tibetan calendar: ཆུ་ཕོ་སྤྲེ་ལོ་ (male Water-Monkey); 1399 or 1018 or 246 — to — ཆུ་མོ་བྱ་ལོ་ (female Water-Bird); 1400 or 1019 or 247

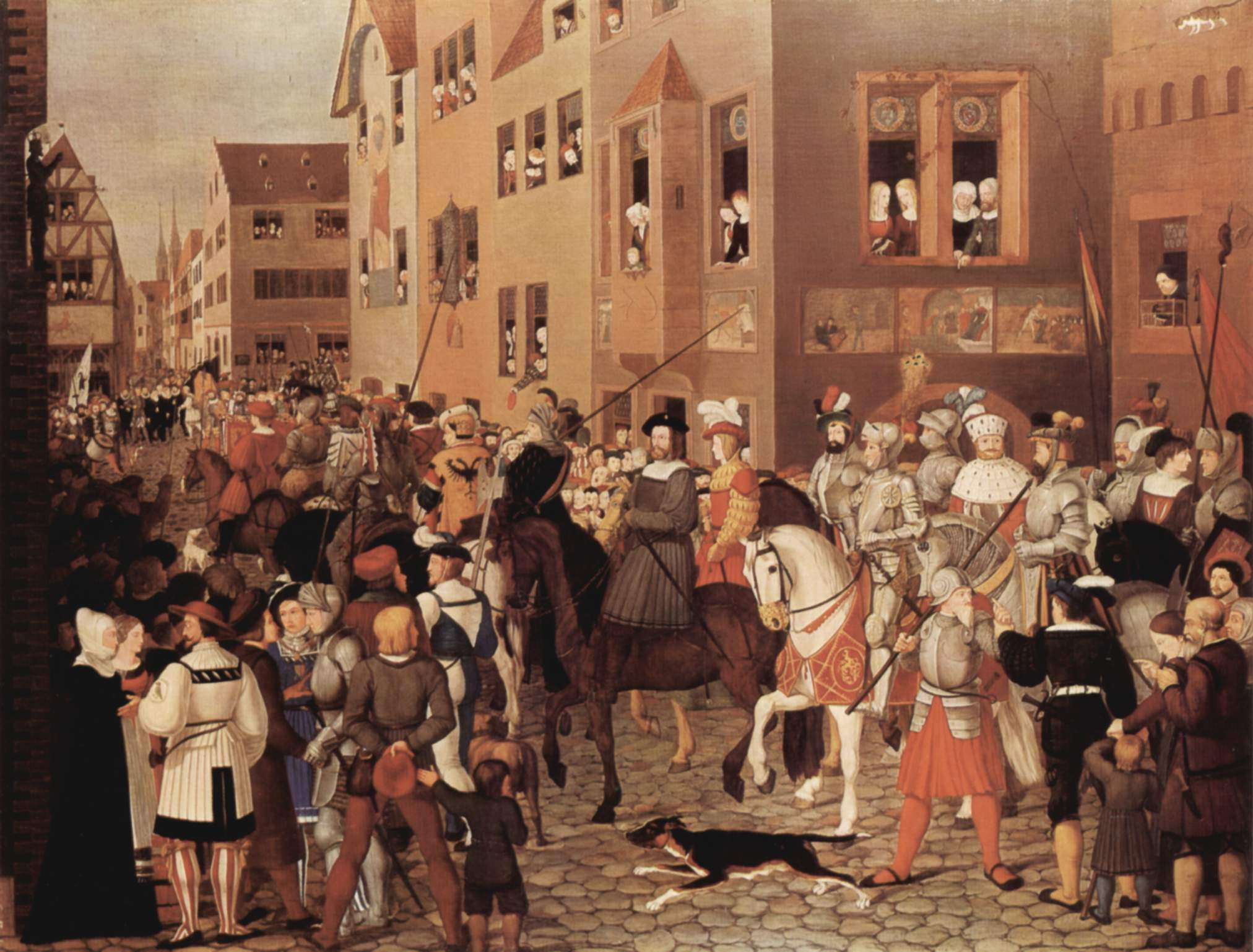
King Rudolf I of Germany is welcomed at Basel, by Franz Pforr (19th century)

Year 1273 (MCCLXXIII) was a common year starting on Sunday of the Julian calendar.

== Events ==
=== By place ===
==== Europe ====
- January 22 – Sultan Muhammad I (or Ibn al-Ahmar) suffers fatal injuries after falling from his horse near the city of Granada during a minor military expedition. He is succeeded by his son Muhammad II, who becomes ruler of the Emirate of Granada. Muhammad enters negotiations with King Alfonso X ("the Wise") to make peace with Castile, but he refuses to grant a truce to the Banu governors (arraeces) of Málaga and Guadix in Andalusia.
- Autumn – Sultan Muhammad II of Granada sends an embassy to the court of Alfonso X in Seville, where it is received with honour. Alfonso agrees to Granada's demands, to end his support for the Banu Ashqilula, in exchange for the promise that Muhammad becomes Alfonso's vassal. Muhammad pays him 450,000 maravedis each year in tribute and grants the Banu rebels a truce for two years.
- October 1 – Rudolf I is elected King of Germany over the rival candidate Ottokar II, king of Bohemia, ending the Great Interregnum. He is the first of many Habsburgs to hold the throne and is crowned in Aachen Cathedral, on October 24. Ottokar refuses to acknowledge Rudolf as the new ruler and is placed under the imperial ban, leading to the outbreak of war in 1276.
- The Congregatio Regni totius Sclavonie Generalis, with its decisions (statuta et constitutiones), is the oldest surviving document written by the Croatian parliament (or Sabor).

==== Middle East ====
- July – Mamluk forces under Baibars capture the last remaining stronghold of the Order of Assassins (Hashashin) sect, Al-Kahf Castle.
- August – Mongol forces surround the castle of Al-Bira. Baibars skirts around the enemy with camels and wagons. He launches a devastating attack and routes the Mongols.
- December – Followers of Persian poet and mystic Rumi establish the Mevlevi Order ("whirling dervishes") in the city of Konya (approximate date).

==== Asia ====
- March 14 – Battle of Xiangyang: Chinese forces surrender to Kublai Khan's general Aju (or Achu) after a 6-year siege. The battle is the first in which firearms are used in combat.
- In Korea, the Sambyeolcho Rebellion against the Goryeo dynasty (a vassal state of the Yuan dynasty) ends as rebel forces are defeated.

=== By topic ===
==== Art and Science ====
- The Holy Redeemer khachkar, believed to be one of the finest examples of that style of art, is carved in Haghpat (modern Armenia).

==== Economy ====
- Alfonso X creates and grants privileges to the Mesta to promote the wool industry, protecting livestock owners and their animals in the Crown of Castile.

==== Religion ====
- October 6 – Thomas Aquinas, Italian priest and theologian, writes Summa Theologica, a master work of Catholic theology, leaving it unfinished, after having a mystical experience during Mass.

== Births ==
- January 14 – Joan I of Navarre, queen of Navarre (d. 1305)
- March 25 – Henry Percy, English nobleman and knight (d. 1314)
- July 22 – Ewostatewos, Ethiopian religious leader (d. 1352)
- November 24 – Alphonso, English prince and heir (d. 1284)
- Abulfeda, Ayyubid prince, geographer and historian (d. 1331)
- Adam de Gordon, Scottish statesman and knight (d. 1333)
- David VIII, king of Georgia (House of Bagrationi) (d. 1311)
- Geoffrey I of Vianden, Luxembourgish nobleman (d. 1310)
- Henry VII of Luxembrug, Holy Roman Emperor (d. 1313)
- Ibn Adjurrum, Marinid scholar and grammarian (d. 1323)
- Kujō Moronori, Japanese nobleman and regent (d. 1320)
- Robert Bertrand, Norman nobleman and knight (d. 1348)
- Yolande of Aragon, Spanish princess (infanta) (d. 1302)
- Min Hti King of Myanmar (d. 1374)

== Deaths ==
- January 22 – Muhammad I, Nasrid ruler of Granada (b. 1195)
- January 25 – Odo of Châteauroux, French bishop (b. 1190)
- April 29 – Al-Qurtubi, Moorish scholar and writer (b. 1214)
- June 13 – Hōjō Masamura, Japanese nobleman (b. 1205)
- July 8 – Anno von Sangershausen, German Grand Master
- September 15 – Henry of Sandwich, English bishop (b. 1204)
- September 30 – Arsenios Autoreianos, Byzantine patriarch
- October 9 – Elisabeth of Bavaria, queen of Germany (b. 1227)
- October 11 – Hildebold of Wunstorf, German archbishop
- October 18 – George de Cantilupe, English nobleman
- October 23 – Adelaide of Burgundy, French noblewoman
- December 17 – Rumi, Persian scholar and mystic (b. 1207)
- Ákos, Hungarian cleric, priest, chancellor and chronicler
- Albert Suerbeer, German archbishop and prince-bishop
- Baldwin of Courtenay, emperor of the Latin Empire (b. 1217)
- George Elmacin, Egyptian historian and writer (b. 1205)
- Ottaviano degli Ubaldini, Italian bishop and cardinal (b. 1214)
- Robert de Keldeleth, Scottish monk, abbot and chancellor
- Robert Walerand, English nobleman, seneschal and judge
