= Château de Vixouze =

Medieval castle in Auvergne-Rhône-Alpes, France

Vixouges Castle
- Château de Vixouges
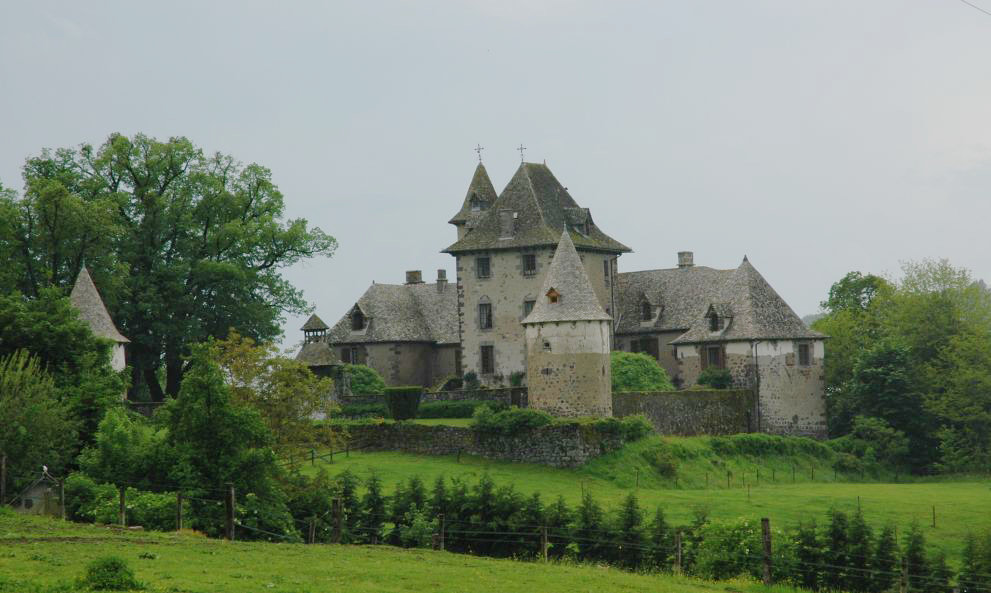
- Château de Vixouges from the south

- Location within France

General information
- Status: Standing
- Location: Polminhac, France
- Coordinates: 44.940556°N 2.593611°E
- Construction started: Guy de Vixouze 1267
- Owner: Mr and Mrs André Leonore

Website
- Official site of the Château de Vixouges

The Château de Vixouges (or Château de Vixouze) is a medieval castle in the commune Polminhac in the Cantal département of the Auvergne, in France.

The entire castle, including the kitchen, dining room, the room on the first floor of the keep, the room on the second floor with a monumental fireplace, the room with pilasters, the room in the north room, the chapel and the bakery was classified on 7 November 2000 as a monument historique..

== Description ==
The central square defensive tower dates from the 13th century. In the 15th century, the tower was rebuilt, the staircase dates from this period. The tower has on its ground floor and in the first floor square rooms and on top of it an attic. A barn is dated to the year 1613. The chapel and the oven are also from the 17th century. Two wings and the boundary wall were created in 1719. The fountain at the entrance of the castle is a work of the 19th century, being erected after 1811.

== History ==
Vixouze was first mentioned as a villa in 930. It was a gift by Bernard de Carlat Vicomte Carlat to the prior of Conques (villa mea que vocatur Vidditiosa).

According to a report dating from 1267, Vixouges was constructed as a noble site with one tower. In the Hundred Years' War, it was largely demolished. It was rebuilt in the 15th century.

== See also ==
- List of castles in France
