= Arjona, Spain =

Municipality in Andalusia, Spain

Arjona
- Municipality
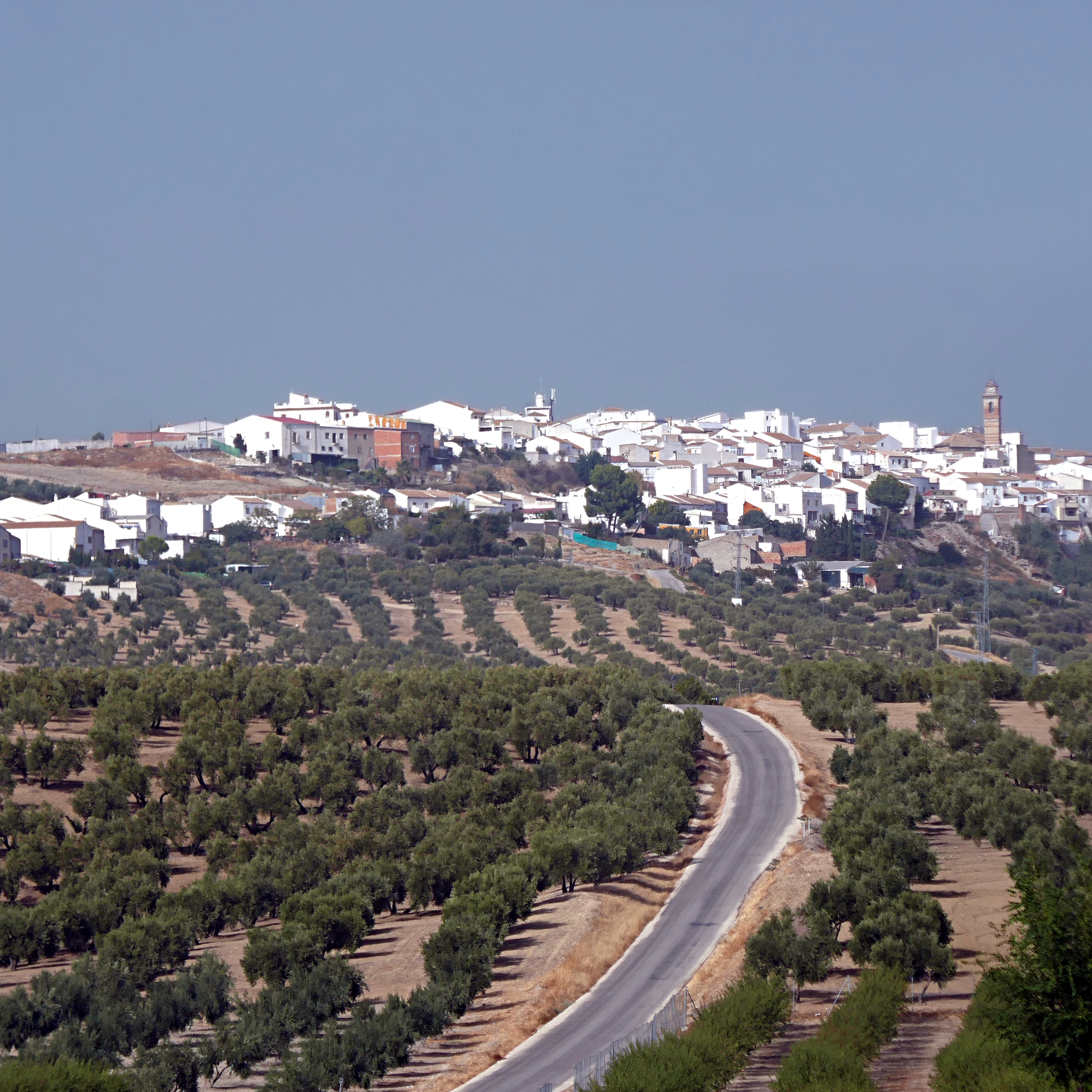

- Flag Coat of arms

- Location of Arjona Arjona (Andalusia) Arjona (Province of Jaén (Spain))
- Coordinates: 37°56′6″N 4°3′25″W
- Country: Spain
- Autonomous community: Andalusia
- Province: Jaén

Area
  - Total: 154.45 km^{2} (59.63 sq mi)
- Elevation: 458 m (1,503 ft)

Population (2025-01-01)
  - Total: 5,330
  - Density: 34.5/km^{2} (89.4/sq mi)
- Demonym: Urgabonense or Arjonero/a
- Website: arjona.es

Arjona is a municipality in the province of Jaén, Andalusia, Spain. It is located 44 kilometres (27 mi) from the provincial capital, Jaén, and 77 kilometres (48 mi) from the city of Córdoba. It has an area of 158.45 square kilometres (61.18 sq mi), and as of 2017 it had a population of 5,662. It belongs to the comarca of Campiña. Its land area is primarily agricultural, with an emphasis on olive trees. Its economy relies primarily on agriculture and olive oil production, but it is also known for its furniture and baking industries. Arjona is known as the birthplace in 1195 of Muhammad I, founder of the Emirate of Granada.

== History ==
Excavations in Arjona's central square revealed a Bronze Age settlement from around 3000 BC. Phoenicians and Greeks also left their mark on the municipal territory, with the name URGABON appearing on Greek coins.

During the Roman Era, Arjona was known as Urgavo or Urgao Alba. After Julius Caesar's victory at the Battle of Munda in 45 BC, Urgavo received a privileged juridical statue for its support of Caesar, as did Illiturgis, Isturgis (now Andújar), and Obulco (now Porcuna). Inscriptions have been found attesting to the city's importance during the Roman Empire, probably connected to the existence of temples dedicated to Augustus and Plotina, the wife of Trajan. Arjona was one of the first places on the Iberian Peninsula that was awarded the Roman citizenship (Municipium Albium Urgabonense). In 308, the execution of the brothers and Christian martyrs Saints Bonosus and Maximianus took place in Arjona.

After the 8th century Umayyad conquest of Hispania, Urgavo came to be known as Qal'at Arjuna in Arabic and was controlled by the Banu Bayila family. After the fall of the Caliphate of Córdoba in 1031, the city participated in the internal fights of the taifa period, during which time its city walls were reinforced. Around the middle of the 12th century, Arjona was taken by the Almohad Caliphate.

In 1195, Arjona was the birthplace of Muhammad ibn Yusuf ibn Nasr, also known as Ibn al-Aḥmar, who would go on to become Muhammad I, the first ruler of the Emirate of Granada and founder of the Nasrid dynasty. He was born in the Alcázar, which is now the Hospital of San Miguel and was formerly known as the Casa del Rey. The Almohad Caliphate went into decline after 1212, and Al-Andalus came under control of Ibn Hud. In 1232, Muhammad started a rebellion in Arjona against Ibn Hud. Muhammad lost the rebellion, but retained Arjona and Jaén. In the following years, he gained control over several other cities, but in 1244 Arjona was taken by the Christian forces of Ferdinand III of Castile. In 1246, Muhammad agreed to surrender Jaén as well and accept Ferdinand's overlordship, creating the Emirate of Granada as a tributary state and becoming its first ruler.

Under Christian rule, Arjona and Jaén were incorporated into the Kingdom of Jaén, a territory of the Crown of Castile. Arjona was initially managed by the Knights Templar, which was dissolved in 1312, then by the Order of Calatrava knights.

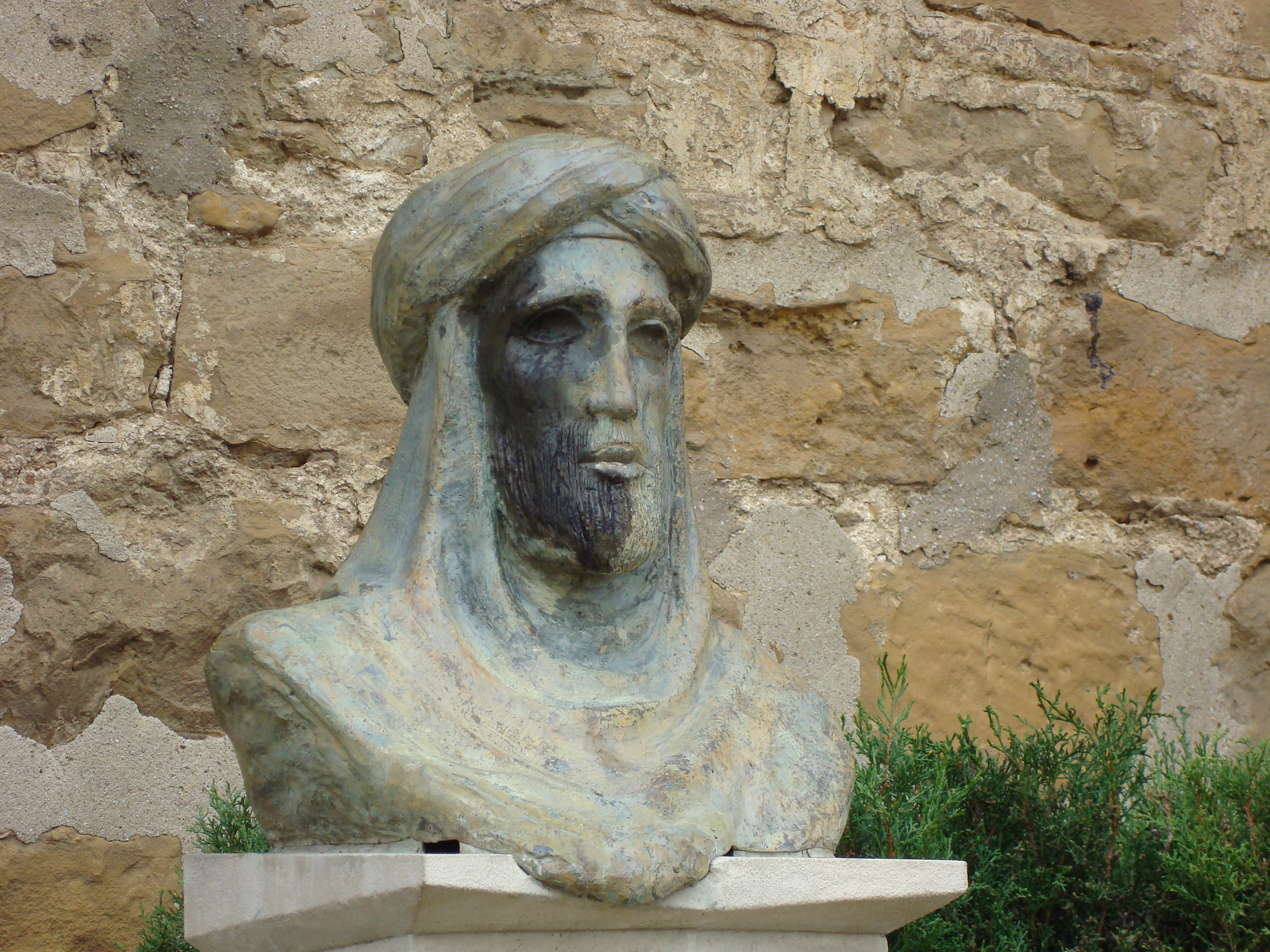
A bust statue of Muhammad I in Arjona

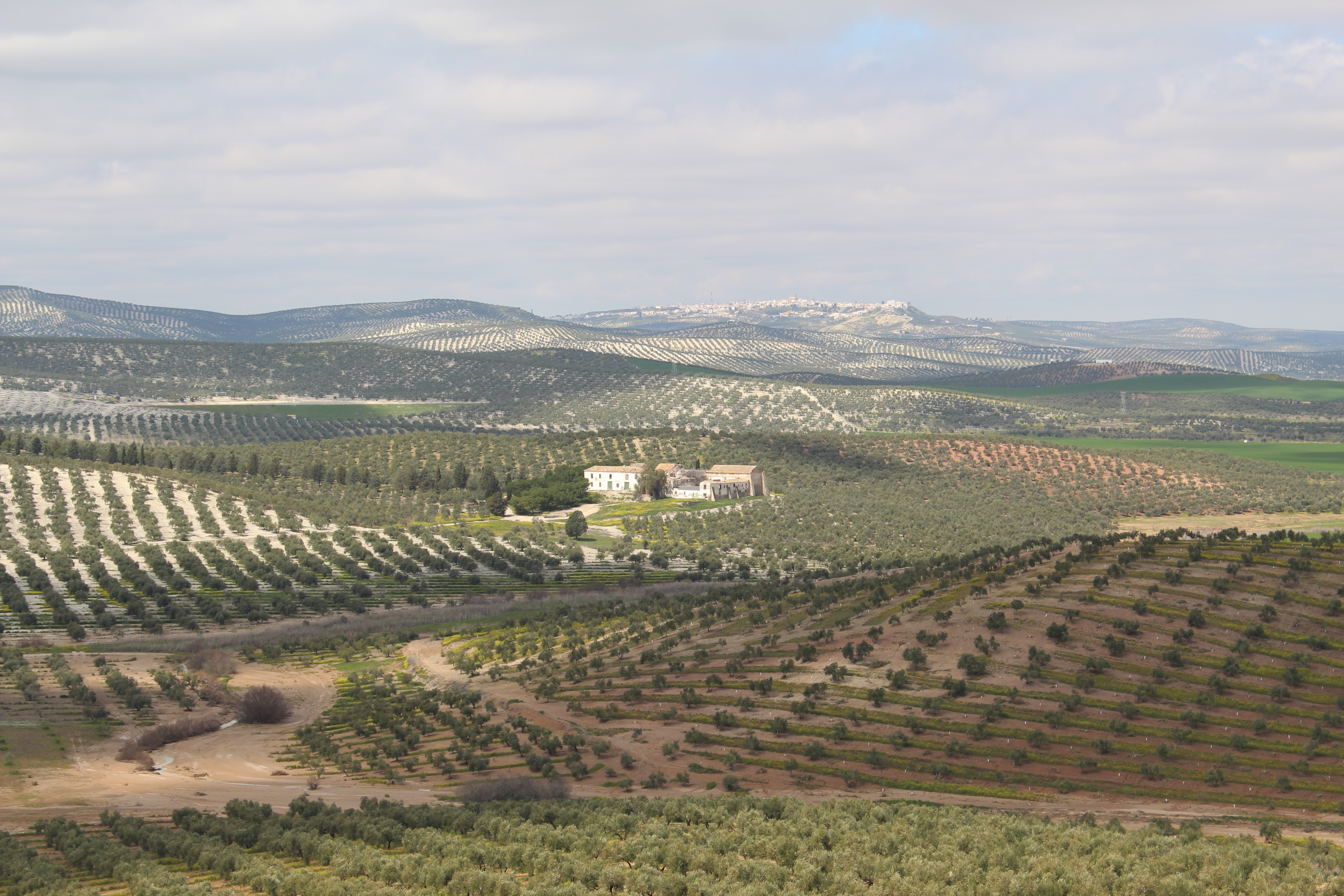
Olive orchards with Arjona in the distance

== See also ==
- List of municipalities in Jaén
