= Banu Ashqilula =

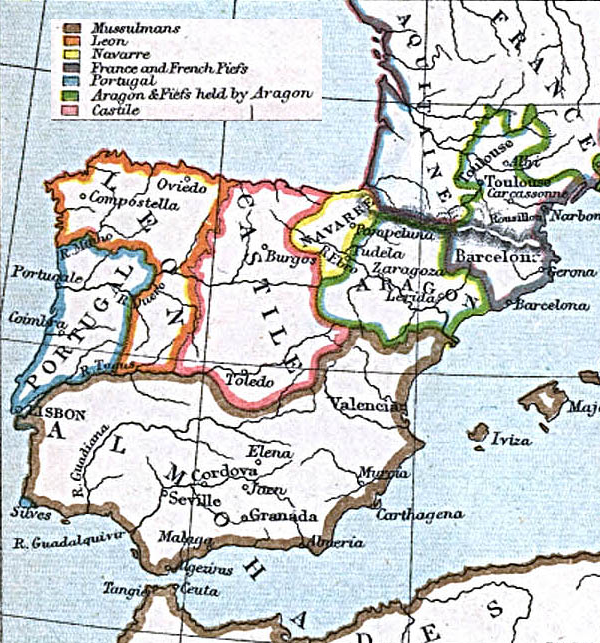
Map of Iberian Kingdoms, 1210

The Banu Ashqilula were an Arab dynasty who governed Málaga and Guadix. Their assistance to Muhammad ibn al-Ahmar in founding the Emirate of Granada and their later opposition to al-Ahmar's successors made the Ashqilula one of the most influential families of the 13th century Spain. The Ashqilula were one of the clans who were able to maneuver themselves into positions of prominence and influence under the rule of the Nasrid Dynasty. The family first rose to prominence in 1232 when their leader Abu'l Hasan Ali Ibn Ashqilula al-Tujibi helped the Nasrid dynasty during the conquest of Granada. For the first twenty years of Nasrid rule in Granada, the Ashqilula worked closely with al-Ahmar in his early endeavors, like the short lived conquest of Seville. As reward for their service, the Asqilula were granted governorships in the Nasrid territories of Málaga, Guadix and Baza.

== Bibliography ==
- Callaghan, Joseph F (2013). A History of Medieval Spain. Ithaca: Cornell University Press. ISBN 978-0-8014-6872-8.
- Harvey, Leonard P (2008). Islamic Spain: 1250 to 1500. Chicago [u.a.: Univ. of Chicago Press. ISBN 978-0-226-31962-9.
- McGilvray, Donald (2012). Granada: the seizure of the sultanate. Leicester: Matador. ISBN 978-1-84876-798-0.
- Thacker, Shelby; Escobar, José; O'Callaghan, Joseph F. (2002). Chronicle of Alfonso X. University Press of Kentucky. ISBN 978-0-8131-2218-2.
