= Timeline of Córdoba, Spain =

The following is a timeline of the history, of the city of Córdoba, Andalusia, Spain.

== Prior to 20th century ==
- 152 BCE – Romans in power.
- 45 BCE – Battle of Munda occurs near Cordoba.
- 4 BCE – Stoic philosopher Seneca the Younger born in Cordoba.
- 294 CE – Hosius becomes bishop.
- 554 CE – Byzantines in power.
- 571 – Visigoth Liuvigild in power.
- 719 – Capital of al-Andalus relocated from Seville to Cordoba.
- 756 – Abd al-Rahman I, founder and first emir of the Emirate of Córdoba, rules from 756 to 788.
- 785 – Great Mosque of Córdoba built.
- 880 – Earthquake.
- 912 – Umayyad Abd-ar-Rahman III becomes Emir of Cordoba.
- 929 – Abd-ar-Rahman III founds the Caliphate of Córdoba and becomes the first Caliph of Córdoba
- 936 – Madinat Al-Zahra construction begins.
- 1009 – Civil war begins.
- 1013 - Sack of Cordoba by Berber troops.
- 1145 - Ibn Hamdin proclaims independence from Almoravid rule in the Grand Mosque but is forced to flee after 14 days.
- 1146 - Temporary occupation of the city by the Kingdom of Castile bar the Alcazar.
- 1236 – Siege of Córdoba
- 1236 – Mosque converted into Cathedral of Córdoba.
- 1277 - Failed Siege of Cordoba by combined Marinid-Granadian troops.
- 1315 – Synagogue founded (approximate date).
- 1367 - Final ever siege of the city by the Muslims operating with the forces of Peter of Castile.
- 1857 – Population: 42,909.

== 20th century ==
- 1910 – Population: 66,831.
- 1930 – Population: 103,106.
- 1979 – Julio Anguita becomes mayor.
- 1981 – Population: 284,737.

== 21st century ==
- 2008 – Population: 325,453.
- 2011 – José Antonio Nieto becomes mayor.

== See also ==
- Córdoba, Andalusia § History
- History of Córdoba (Spain)
- List of mayors of Córdoba
- Timelines of other cities in the autonomous community of Andalusia: Timeline of Almería, Timeline of Cádiz, Timeline of Granada, Timeline of Jaén, Timeline of Jerez de la Frontera, Timeline of Málaga, Timeline of Seville
- List of municipalities in Andalusia

== Bibliography ==
Published in the 19th century

- "Spain: Cordova", Cities and Principal Towns of the World, Cabinet Cyclopaedia, London: Longman, Rees, Orme, Brown, & Green, 1830, OCLC 2665202
- Arthur de Capell Brooke (1831), "Cordova", Sketches in Spain and Morocco, London: Henry Colburn and Richard Bentley, OCLC 13783280
- Richard Ford (1855), "Cordova", A Handbook for Travellers in Spain (3rd ed.), London: J. Murray, OCLC 2145740
- John Lomas, ed. (1889), "Cordova", O'Shea's Guide to Spain and Portugal (8th ed.), Edinburgh: Adam & Charles Black

Published in the 20th century

- Albert Frederick Calvert (1907), Cordova, a city of the Moors, London: J. Lane, OL 23291161M
- "Cordova", Jewish Encyclopedia, vol. 4, New York, 1907, hdl:2027/osu.32435029752912
- "Cordova", Spain and Portugal (3rd ed.), Leipzig: Karl Baedeker, 1908, OCLC 1581249
- Manuel Garcia Osuna (1908). "Cordova". Catholic Encyclopedia. New York.
- Somerset Maugham (1920). "Cordova". Land of the Blessed Virgin; Sketches and Impressions in Andalusia. New York: A.A. Knopf. hdl:2027/nyp.33433081585832.
- Philip Khuri Hitti (1973). "Cordova". Capital Cities of Arab Islam. University of Minnesota Press. ISBN 978-0-8166-0663-4.
- Robert Hillenbrand (1992). "'The Ornament of the World': medieval Cordoba as a cultural centre". In Salma Khadra Jayyusi (ed.). The Legacy of Muslim Spain. EJ Brill. ISBN 90-04-09599-3.
- Trudy Ring, ed. (1996). "Cordoba". Southern Europe. International Dictionary of Historic Places. Vol. 3. Fitzroy Dearborn. pp. 155+. ISBN 9781884964022. OCLC 31045650.

Published in the 21st century

- Clifford Edmund Bosworth, ed. (2007). "Cordova". Historic Cities of the Islamic World. Leiden: Koninklijke Brill. pp. 102+. ISBN 978-9004153882.
- "Cordoba". Grove Encyclopedia of Islamic Art & Architecture. Oxford University Press. 2009. ISBN 978-0-19-530991-1.
- Ann Christys (2010). "The meaning of topography in Umayyad Córdoba". In Caroline Goodson; et al. (eds.). Cities, Texts, and Social Networks, 400-1500: Experiences and Perceptions of Medieval Urban Space. Ashgate Publishing, Ltd. ISBN 978-0-7546-6723-0.
- David Gilmour (2012). "Cordoba". Cities of Spain. Random House. ISBN 978-1-4481-3833-3.
