= Granada chronology =

The following is a chronology of the history of the city of Granada, Andalusia, Spain.

== Before 16th century ==
- 64 CE – Diocese of Granada established (approximate date).
- 8th century – City wall construction begins.
- 713 CE – Muslims in power.
- 1066 – Massacred the Jewish population of the city 1066 Granada massacre
- 1090 – Almoravids in power.
- 1166 – Almohads in power.
- 1238 – City becomes capital of the Nasrid Emirate of Granada, Al-Andalus; Muhammad ibn Nasr in power.
- 1248 – Alhambra construction begins.
- 1309 – Generalife built.
- 1319 – Alcázar Genil built.
- 1330s – Corral del Carbón built.
- 1349 – Yusufiyya Madrasa established.
- 1367 – Maristan (hospital) built.
- 1370 – Alhambra's Palace of the Myrtles built.
- 1391 – Alhambra's Palace of the Lions built.
- 1410s – Antequeruela settlement developed.
- 1492
  - City becomes capital of the Kingdom of Granada (Crown of Castile).
  - Edict of Expulsion of Jews issued.
- 1493 – Hernando de Talavera becomes archbishop.
- 1496 – Printing press in use.
- 1499 – Muslim rebellions in Granada province.

== 16th-19th centuries ==
- 1501 – City divided into 23 parishes.
- 1504 – Hospital Real de Granada founded.
- 1505 – Real Chancillería de Granada established.
- 1516 – Carthusian monastery built outside city.
- 1521 – Capilla Real built.
- 1525 – Burial of monarchs Ferdinand and Isabella in the Capilla Real.
- 1531 – University of Granada founded.
- 1587 – Chancillería (tribunal building) constructed.
- 1593 – Theatre built.
- 1600 – Population: 55,000
- 1614 – Expulsion of the Moriscos.
- 1624 – April: Philip IV visits city.
- 1703 – Granada Cathedral built.
- 1764 – Gacetilla Curiosa begins publication.
- 1810 – Occupation of city by French forces begins.
- 1812 – Occupation of city by French forces ends.
- 1833 – Province of Granada established.
- 1839 – Museo de Bellas Artes de Granada established.
- 1843 – Alcaiceria (bazaar) burns down.
- 1879 – Provincial Archaeological Museum of Granada established.
- 1892 – Caja General de Ahorros de Granada (bank) founded.
- 1900 – Population: 75,900.

== 20th century ==
- 1910 – Cafe Futbol in business.
- 1920 – Population: 103,368.
- 1929 – Casa de los Tiros Museum established.
- 1931 – Granada Club de Fútbol formed.
- 1936
  - March: Post-election unrest.
  - 19 August: Death of poet Lorca in Alfacar.
- 1940 – Population: 155,405.
- 1961 – Cine Madrigal (cinema) opens.
- 1972 – Airport opens.
- 1981 – Population: 262,182.
- 1984 – Alhambra declared a UNESCO World Heritage Site.
- 1986 – Huerta de San Vicente Museum (of Lorca) active (approximate date).
- 1991
  - Jesús Quero Molina becomes mayor.
  - Population: 287,864.
- 1995
  - Parque de las Ciencias (science museum) and Estadio Nuevo Los Cármenes (stadium) open.
  - Gabriel Díaz Berbel becomes mayor.
- 1999 – José Enrique Moratalla becomes mayor.

== 21st century ==
- 2003
  - Mosque built.
  - José Torres Hurtado becomes mayor.
- 2004
  - Granada Atlético Club de Fútbol formed.
  - Kinepolis Granada (cinema) opens near city.
- 2007 – Granada metro construction begins.
- 2008 – Hay Festival of literature held.
- 2014 – CajaGranada Fundación established.

== See also ==
- Granada history
- Timeline of the Muslim presence in the Iberian Peninsula, circa 8th-15th century CE
- Timelines of other cities in the autonomous community of Andalusia: Almería, Cádiz, Córdoba, Jaén, Jerez de la Frontera, Málaga, Seville
- List of municipalities in Andalusia

== Bibliography ==
Published in the 19th century

- Jedidiah Morse; Richard C. Morse (1823), "Granada", New Universal Gazetteer (4th ed.), New Haven: S. Converse
- David Brewster, ed. (1830). "Granada". Edinburgh Encyclopædia. Edinburgh: William Blackwood.
- Arthur de Capell Brooke (1831), "(Granada)", Sketches in Spain and Morocco, London: Henry Colburn and Richard Bentley, OCLC 13783280
- Richard Ford (1855), "Granada", A Handbook for Travellers in Spain (3rd ed.), London: J. Murray, OCLC 2145740
- John Lomas, ed. (1889), "Granada", O'Shea's Guide to Spain and Portugal (8th ed.), Edinburgh: Adam & Charles Black
- Manuel Gómez-Moreno (1892). Guía de Granada [Guide to Granada] (in Spanish). Indalecio Ventura.
- Ángel Ganivet (1896). Granada la bella [Granada the Beautiful] (in Spanish). 1905 ed.

Published in the 20th century

- "Granada", Jewish Encyclopedia, vol. 6, New York, 1907, hdl:2027/osu.32435078660974
- "Granada", Spain and Portugal (3rd ed.), Leipsic: Karl Baedeker, 1908, OCLC 1581249
- Benjamin Vincent (1910), "Granada", Haydn's Dictionary of Dates (25th ed.), London: Ward, Lock & Co.
- "Granada (city)" . Encyclopædia Britannica. Vol. 12 (11th ed.). 1911. pp. 335–336.
- "Granada (province)" . Encyclopædia Britannica. Vol. 12 (11th ed.). 1911. pp. 334–335.
- J. Bosque Maurel (1962), Geografía urbana de Granada (in Spanish)
- Gallego Burin (1982). Granada: Guia artistica e historica de la ciudad (in Spanish).
- "Granada", Spain, Portugal, & Morocco, Let's Go, St. Martin's Press, 1990, pp. 194+, OL 10384941M
- J Dickie. Granada: A case study of Arab urbanism in Muslim Spain. 1992.
- "Andalucia: Granada", Spain (8th ed.), Rough Guides, 1999, pp. 291+, OL 9003565M

Published in the 21st century

- Juan Carlos Rodriguez (2001). "(Granada)". In Joan Ramon Resina (ed.). Iberian Cities. Routledge. ISBN 978-1-136-53463-8. (discusses Ganivet's writing about Granada)
- Teodoro Luque-Martínez and Francisco Muñoz-Leiva. "City benchmarking: a methodological proposal referring specifically to Granada." Cities 22.6 (2005): 411–423.
- Athena C. Syrakoy (2007). "Maristan and its role in Nasrid Granada". In Amira K. Bennison and Alison L. Gascoigne (ed.). Cities in the Pre-Modern Islamic World. Routledge. ISBN 978-1-134-09650-3.
- D Coleman. Creating Christian Granada: Society and Religious Culture in an Old-World Frontier City, 1492–1600. 2013
