= Timeline of Seville =

The following is a timeline of the history of the city of Seville, Andalusia, Spain.

== Prior to 18th century ==
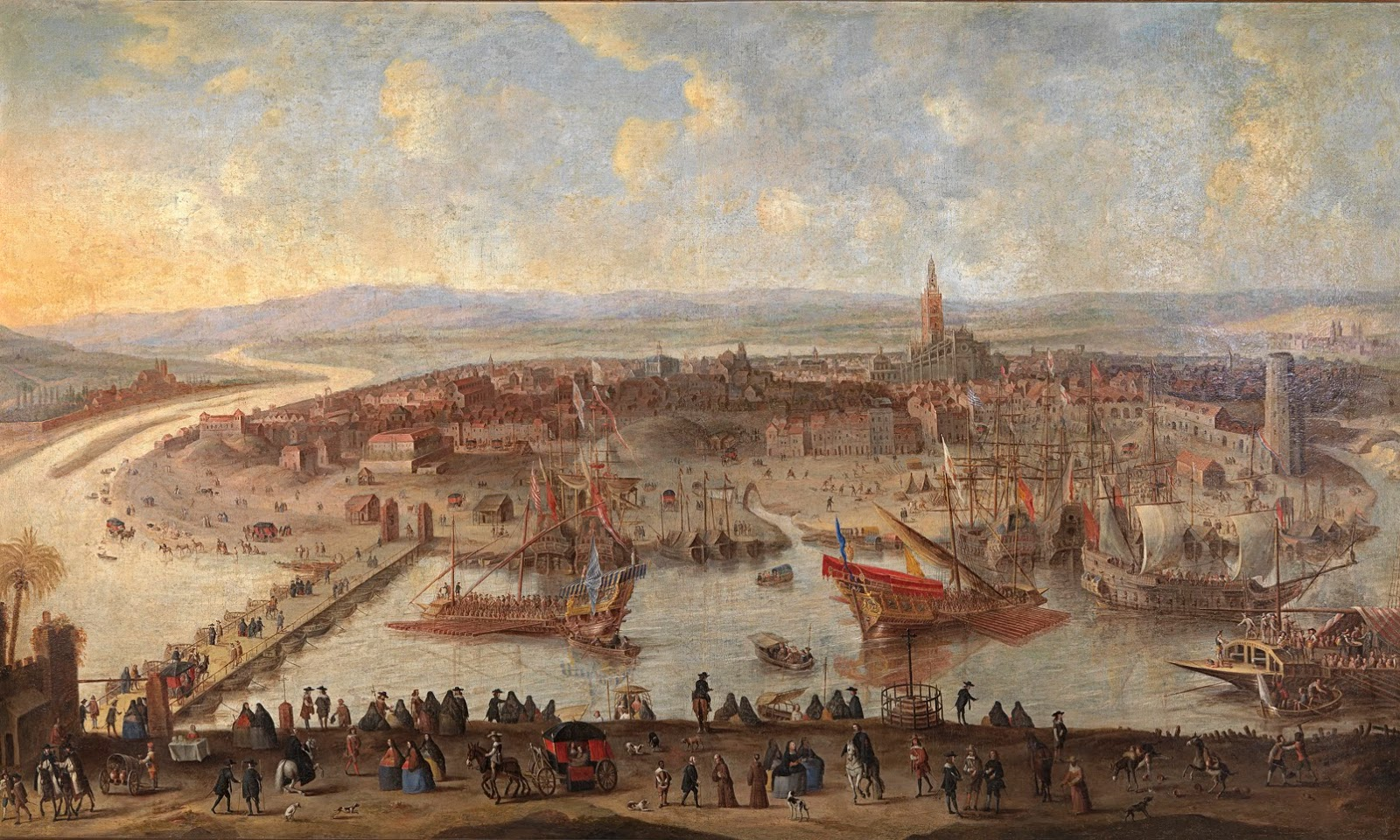
Sevilla in the 17th century

- 491 – Cathedral of Seville is built
- 600 – Isidore of Seville becomes bishop.
- 630 – Isidore of Seville compiles encyclopedia Etymologiae (approximate date).
- 713 – Musa bin Nusayr in power.
- 829 – Mosque built.
- 844 – City raided by Vikings
- 1023 – Abbadid Taifa of Seville established.
- 1147 - Almohades take power.
- 1181 – Alcázar (fort) construction begins.
- 1198 – Minaret built.
- 1247 – Siege of Seville begins.
- 1248 – Seville incorporated into the Christian Kingdom of Castile under Ferdinand III.
- 1252 – Seville Shipyard built.
- 1477 – Printing press in use.
- 1503 – Casa de Contratación (trade agency) established.
- 1505 - University of Seville founded as "Colegio Santa María de Jesús".
- 1507 - Seville Cathedral consecrated.
- 1519 - Magellan embarks on circumnavigation expedition.
- 1521 – Via Crucis to the Cruz del Campo laid out.
- 1543 – Consulado de Cargadores a Indias established.
- 1563 – Court of Philip II relocated from Seville to Madrid.
- 1598 – Merchants exchange built.
- 1627 – Flood.
- 1630 – Artist Zurbarán settles in Seville.
- 1647 – Great Plague of Seville begins.
- 1670 – Real Maestranza de Caballería de Sevilla (a chivalric order) established.
- 1682 – University of Navigators building construction begins.
- 1683 – Flood.

== 18th–19th centuries ==
- 1717 – Casa de Contratación relocated from Seville to Cádiz.
- 1729
  - Court of Philip V relocated to Seville.
  - Treaty of Seville signed in Seville.
- 1758 – Royal Tobacco Factory begins operating.
- 1785 – General Archive of the Indies established.
- 1800 - Outbreak of yellow fever kills 30,000.
- 1810 – February: French occupation begins.
- 1812 – French occupation ends.
- 1842 – Population: 100,498.
- 1843 – City besieged by forces of Espartero.
- 1847 – First Seville Fair held at the Prado de San Sebastián.
- 1852 – Triana Bridge built.
- 1869 – City wall dismantled.
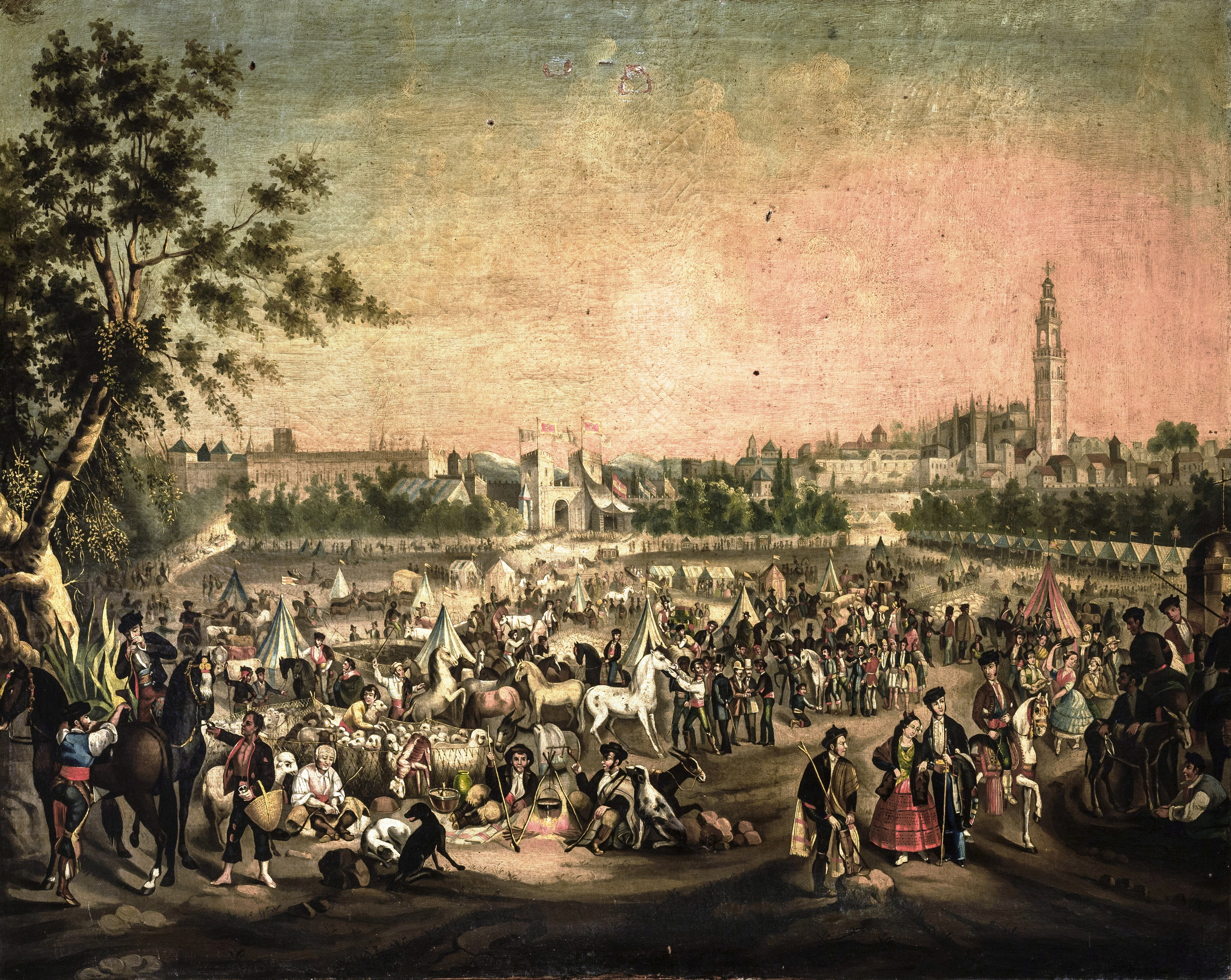
  Seville Fair in the 19th century
- 1881 – Plaza de toros de la Real Maestranza de Caballería de Sevilla (bullring) built.
- 1890 – Sevilla Football Club formed.
- 1893 – María Luisa Park established.
- 1896
  - La Pasarela (Sevilla) built at the Prado de San Sebastián.
  - 28 October: Cyclone.
- 1897 – Population: 146,205.
- 1900 – Population: 148,315.

== 20th century ==
- 1901 – Estación de Plaza de Armas (railway station) opens.
- 1902 – Burial site of Christopher Columbus relocated to Seville from Cuba.
- 1905
  - Sevilla FC officially registered with the local government.
  - Muelle de Nueva York (Sevilla) built.
- 1907
  - Real Betis football club formed.
  - Ship canal completed from the Punta de los Remedios to the Punta del Verde.
- 1915 – Aeródromo de Tablada (airport) built.
- 1920 – Population: 205,529.
- 1926 – Puente de Alfonso XIII (bridge) built.
- 1928 – Plaza de España built.
- 1929
  - Ibero-American Exposition of 1929 held.
  - Estadio Municipal Heliópolis, later known as Estadio Benito Villamarín, opens.
  - Lope de Vega Theatre opens.
- 1931 – Puente de San Telmo (bridge) built.
- 1933 – Seville Airport (Aeropuerto de San Pablo) opens.
- 1936 – July 1936 military uprising in Seville.
- 1950 – Population: 376,627.
- 1959 – Seville Public Library established.
- 1979 – Luis Uruñuela becomes mayor.
- 1981
  - Regional Government of Andalusia headquartered in Seville.
  - Population: 653,833.
- 1983
  - 21 December: Last and decisive qualifier match for UEFA Euro 1984 held: Spain 12–1 Malta.
  - Manuel del Valle becomes mayor.
- 1987 – UNESCO World Heritage Site in Seville established.
- 1990
  - Royal Seville Symphony Orchestra formed.
  - Puente de las Delicias (bridge) built.
- 1991
  - Teatro de la Maestranza (opera house) opens.
  - Auditorio Rocío Jurado opens
  - Estación de Sevilla-Santa Justa (railway station) opens.
  - San Bernardo railway station opens.
  - Seville Airport new terminal opens.
  - Puente Reina Sofía (bridge) built.
  - Alejandro Rojas-Marcos becomes mayor.
  - Guitar Legends festival held.
  - Puente del Centenario (bridge) built.
- 1992
  - Madrid–Seville high-speed rail line begins operating.
  - Alamillo Bridge and Puente de la Barqueta (bridge) built.
  - Teatro Central (Sevilla) opens.
  - Seville Expo '92 held.
  - Institución Colombina established.
  - Torre de la Plata restored.
- 1993 – Alamillo Park opens.
- 1994 – I Encuentro entre el Son Cubano y el Flamenco (festival) held.
- 1995 – Soledad Becerril becomes mayor.
- 1998
  - First Territorios Sevilla festival held.
  - Centro Andaluz de Arte Contemporáneo opens.
  - Nervión Plaza mall and cinema open.
- 1999
  - Plaza de Armas reopens as a mall and cinema.
  - Alfredo Sánchez Monteseirín becomes mayor.
  - Estadio de La Cartuja built.
  - 7th World Championships in Athletics held.

== 21st century ==
- 2003 – 2003 UEFA Cup Final between Celtic and Porto held at the Estadio de La Cartuja.
- 2004
  - Starbucks opens its first establishment in the city.
  - First Festival de Cine Europeo de Sevilla held.
  - 2004 Davis Cup finals held at the Estadio de La Cartuja.
- 2007
  - Avenida de la Constitución (Sevilla) pedestrianized.
  - Sevici bicycle service begins operating.
  - MetroCentro tram line begins operating.
- 2009 – Seville Metro begins operating.
- 2010 – Jardín Americano reopens.
- 2011
  - Metropol Parasol erected.
  - Juan Ignacio Zoido becomes mayor.
  - 2011 Davis Cup finals held at the Estadio de La Cartuja.
  - Population: 703,021.
- 2012
  - Pabellón de la Navegación (Sevilla) reopens as a museum.
  - Muelle de Nueva York (Sevilla) reopens as a public space.
- 2014 – Alamillo Park expanded.
- 2015
  - Torre Sevilla skyscraper erected.
  - Juan Espadas becomes mayor.
- 2016 – Hard Rock Cafe opens its first restaurant in the city.
- 2018 – Torre Sevilla shopping mall opens.

== See also ==
- History of Seville
- List of mayors of Seville
- Timeline of the Muslim presence in the Iberian Peninsula, circa 8th-15th century CE
- Timelines of other cities in the autonomous community of Andalusia: Almería, Cádiz, Córdoba, Granada, Jaén, Jerez de la Frontera, Málaga
- List of municipalities in Andalusia

== Bibliography ==
Published in 19th century

- David Brewster, ed. (1832). "Seville". Edinburgh Encyclopaedia. Philadelphia: Joseph and Edward Parker. hdl:2027/uc2.ark:/13960/t82j6q872.
- Richard Ford (1855), "Seville", A Handbook for Travellers in Spain (3rd ed.), London: J. Murray, OCLC 2145740
- Sevilla y Cádiz. Recuerdos y bellezas de España (in Spanish). Madrid: Jose Repullés. 1856.
- William Smith, ed. (1872) [1854]. "Híspalis". Dictionary of Greek and Roman Geography. London: John Murray. hdl:2027/hvd.ah5cuq.
- John Lomas, ed. (1889), "Seville", O'Shea's Guide to Spain and Portugal (8th ed.), Edinburgh: Adam & Charles Black

Published in 20th century

- "Seville". Guide to the Western Mediterranean. London: Macmillan and Co. 1906.
- "Seville", Jewish Encyclopedia, vol. 11, New York, 1907, hdl:2027/osu.32435029752847
- "Seville", Spain and Portugal (3rd ed.), Leipsic: Karl Baedeker, 1908, OCLC 1581249
- "Seville (city)" . Encyclopædia Britannica. Vol. 24 (11th ed.). 1910. pp. 731–733.
- Benjamin Vincent (1910), "Seville", Haydn's Dictionary of Dates (25th ed.), London: Ward, Lock & Co.
- Nathaniel Newnham Davis (1911), "Seville", The Gourmet's Guide to Europe (3rd ed.), London: Grant Richards, hdl:2027/loc.ark:/13960/t06x01n78
- Ramon Ruiz Amado (1913). "Seville". Catholic Encyclopedia. New York: New York, The Encyclopedia Press.
- Somerset Maugham (1920). "Seville". Land of the Blessed Virgin; Sketches and Impressions in Andalusia. New York: A.A. Knopf. hdl:2027/nyp.33433081585832.
- "Seville, More Spanish Than Spain", National Geographic Magazine, vol. 55, Washington DC, 1929
- R. Valencia (1992). "Islamic Seville - its political, social and cultural history". In Salma Khadra Jayyusi (ed.). The Legacy of Muslim Spain. EJ Brill. ISBN 90-04-09599-3.
- Trudy Ring, ed. (1996). "Seville". Southern Europe. International Dictionary of Historic Places. Vol. 3. Fitzroy Dearborn. p. 639. ISBN 9781134259588. OCLC 31045650.

Published in 21st century

- Josef W. Meri, ed. (2006). "Seville". Medieval Islamic Civilization. Routledge. ISBN 978-0-415-96691-7.
- C. Edmund Bosworth, ed. (2007). "Seville". Historic Cities of the Islamic World. Leiden: Koninklijke Brill. pp. 472+. ISBN 978-9004153882.
- Patrick O'Flanagan (2008). "Seville". Port Cities of Atlantic Iberia, c.1500-1900. Ashgate. ISBN 978-0-7546-6109-2.
- David Gilmour (2012). "Seville". Cities of Spain. Random House. ISBN 978-1-4481-3833-3.
