= Timeline of Cádiz =

The following is a timeline of the history of the city of Cádiz, Spain.

== Prior to 20th century ==
- 1104 BCE – Gadir founded by Phoenicians.
- 530 BCE – Gades occupied by Carthaginians.
- 206 BCE - Gades surrenders to the Romans under Scipio Africanus
- 49 BCE – Julius Caesar conferred the civitas of Rome on the citizens of Gades.
- 19 BCE – Lucius Cornelius Balbus, a general and politician from Gades, becomes the first and only private individual of provincial origin to be awarded a Roman triumph.
- 4 CE – Birth of Columella, a prominent writer on agriculture.
- 200 CE – Population: 20,000.
- 711 CE – Moors in power (until 1262) & city called "Jezirat-Kadis."
- 1217 – The city was raided by a group of Frisian crusaders en route to the Holy Land.
- 1241 – Roman Catholic Diocese of Cádiz established.
- 1262 – Cádiz taken by Alfonso X of Castile.
- 1492 – Discovery of America renewed its prosperity.
- 1587 – Spanish fleet attacked and Cádiz raided by Sir Francis Drake.
- 1596 – Capture of Cádiz by English and Dutch forces; city sacked.
- 1602 – Santa Cruz Cathedral rebuilt.
- 1625 – November: Attempted English and Dutch Cádiz Expedition.
- 1656 – 9 September: Battle of Cádiz; Spanish victory

Battle of Cádiz.

  - Population: 30,000.
- 1706 – Castle of San Sebastián (Cádiz) constructed.
- 1717 – Casa de Contratación (House of Trade) relocated to Cádiz from Seville.
- 1722 – Cádiz Cathedral construction begins.
- 1748 – Real Colegio de Cirugía de la Armada established.^{(es)}
- 1749 – Jardín Botánico (garden) founded (approximate date).
- 1778 – "Colonial monopoly of the Port of Cádiz with the American colonies is abolished."
- 1787 – Population: 71,080.
- 1797 – June: British Assault on Cádiz; Spaniards win.
- 1800 – Bombarded by Nelson.
- 1810
  - February: French Siege of Cádiz begins.
  - 24 September: Cortes of Cádiz (national assembly) convenes in Cádiz.
- 1810-1813 – Population: 85,000.
- 1812
  - 19 March: Spanish Constitution of 1812 adopted after deliberations of the Cortes of Cádiz.
  - August: Siege of Cádiz ends.
- 1820: On March 10, 1820, in the Plaza de San Juan de Dios in Cádiz, Royalist absolutist troops carried out a massacre against those of the population of Cádiz who supported the liberals and were celebrating the proclamation of the Constitution of 1812.
- 1823
  - May: Ferdinand VII of Spain imprisoned at Cádiz.
  - 31 August: Battle of Trocadero.
- 1829 – "Cádiz declared a free port."
- 1838 – Cádiz Cathedral construction completed.
- 1842 – Population: 53,922.
- 1860 – Population: 71,521.
- 1867 – Diario de Cádiz newspaper begins publication.
- 1868 – The Glorious Revolution centred on Cádiz.
- 1873 – Cantonalist Cantón de Cádiz proclaimed.
- 1900 – Population: 69,382.

== 20th century ==
- 1905 – Gran Teatro Falla (theatre) built.
- 1910
  - Cádiz Club de Fútbol formed.
  - Population: 67,306.
- 1930 – Population: 75,789.
- 1932 – Cine Gades (cinema) active.
- 1947 – Cádiz Explosion takes place.
- 1949 – Teatro Andalucía (theatre) opens.
- 1950 – Population: 100,249.
- 1955 – Estadio Ramón de Carranza (stadium) opens.
- 1969 – Muestra Cinematográfica del Atlántico Alcances (film festival) begins.
- 1970 – Museum of Cádiz established.
- 1979 – University of Cádiz established.
- 1986 – Festival Iberoamericano de Teatro de Cádiz begins.
- 1991 – Population: 157,355.
- 1995 – Teófila Martínez becomes mayor.

== 21st century ==
- 2011 – Population: 124,014.
- 2015 – José María González Santos becomes mayor.

== See also ==
- History of Cádiz (in Spanish)
- List of mayors of Cadiz
- Timelines of other cities in the autonomous community of Andalusia: Almería, Córdoba, Granada, Jaén, Jerez de la Frontera, Málaga, Seville
- List of municipalities in Andalusia

== Bibliography ==
=== in English ===
Published in the 19th century

- Abraham Rees (1819), "Cadiz", The Cyclopaedia, London: Longman, Hurst, Rees, Orme & Brown
- Josiah Conder (1830), "Cadiz", The Modern Traveller, London: J.Duncan
- Richard Ford (1855), "Cádiz", A Handbook for Travellers in Spain (3rd ed.), London: J. Murray, OCLC 2145740
- William Henry Overall, ed. (1870). "Cádiz". Dictionary of Chronology. London: William Tegg. hdl:2027/uc2.ark:/13960/t9m32q949.
- John Ramsay McCulloch (1877), "Cadiz", in Hugh G. Reid (ed.), A Dictionary, Practical, Theoretical and Historical of Commerce and Commercial Navigation, London: Longmans, Green, and Co., hdl:2027/njp.32101079877088
- John Lomas, ed. (1889), "Cádiz", O'Shea's Guide to Spain and Portugal (8th ed.), Edinburgh: Adam & Charles Black

Published in the 20th century

- Astin, A E; et al., eds. (1989). Rome and the Mediterranean to 133 BC. Cambridge Ancient History. Vol. 8 (2nd ed.). Cambridge University Press. ISBN 0-521-23448-4. OCLC 916019669.
- Briscoe, John. "The Second Punic War". In CAH^{2} 8 (1989), pp. 44–80.
- "Cadiz". Chambers's Encyclopaedia. London. 1901. hdl:2027/hvd.hn52jk.
- "Cádiz", Spain and Portugal (3rd ed.), Leipsic: Karl Baedeker, 1908, OCLC 1581249
- "Cadiz (capital)" . Encyclopædia Britannica. Vol. 4 (11th ed.). 1910. pp. 929–930.
- Somerset Maugham (1920). "Cádiz". Land of the Blessed Virgin; Sketches and Impressions in Andalusia. New York: A.A. Knopf. hdl:2027/nyp.33433081585832.

Published in the 21st century

- Patrick O'Flanagan (2008). "Cádiz". Port Cities of Atlantic Iberia, c.1500-1900. Ashgate. ISBN 978-0-7546-6109-2.
- David Gilmour (2012). "Cádiz". Cities Of Spain. Random House. ISBN 978-1-4481-3833-3.
- Briscoe, John (2012). "Cornelius Scipio Africanus, Publius, 'the elder'". Oxford Classical Dictionary (4th ed.). Oxford University Press. doi:10.1093/acrefore/9780199381135.013.1867. ISBN 978-0-19-938113-5.

=== in Spanish ===
- Sevilla y Cádiz. Recuerdos y bellezas de España (in Spanish). Madrid. 1856.
  - Sevilla y Cádiz. España: sus monumentos y artes, su naturaleza e historia (in Spanish). Barcelona: Daniel Cortezo y ca. 1884.
- Adolfo de Castro (1858). Historia de Cádiz y su provincia (in Spanish). Cádiz: Imprenta de la Revista Médica.
- José Marí León y Domínguez (1897). Recuerdos gaditanos (in Spanish). Cádiz: Cabello y Lozón.
