= Timeline of Málaga =

The following is a timeline of the history of the city of Málaga, Andalusia, Spain.

== Ancient history ==
- 770 BCE – Malake (MLKʾ) founded by Phoenicians from Tyre.
- 205 BCE – Roman Republic in power in Malaca (Hispania).
- 81-84 CE – Lex Malacitana or Lex Flavia Malacitana is given. Malaca was governed under this law, which granted free-born persons the privileges of Roman citizenship.

== Middle Ages ==
=== Early Middle Ages ===
- 571 CE – Visigoth Leovigild in power.
- 711 CE – Umayyad invasion .
- 756 CE – Umayyad Abd al-Rahman I in power.
- 907 CE – Mālaqah besieged by forces of Aban son of Abd Allah.

=== High Middle Ages ===
- 1035 – Palace of the Alcazaba built.
- 1079 – "Conquest of Malaga by Ibn Omar."

=== Late Middle Ages ===
- 1232 – Mālaqah becomes part of the Nasrid Kingdom of Granada.
- 1350 – Traveler Ibn Battuta visits city.

== Modern Period ==
- 1486 – 4 August: Roman Catholic Diocese of Málaga established.
- 1487 – Siege of Málaga (1487); Málaga is incorporated in the Crown of Castile and repopulated.
- 1490 – Santiago el Mayor church built.
- 1494 – Earthquake.
- 1505 – Hospital of Santo Tomas founded.
- 1522 – Málaga Cathedral construction begins.
- 1540 – Buenavista Palace built.
- 1656 – 21 July: Raid on Málaga by English forces.
- 1680 – 1680 Malaga earthquake.
- 1719 – Málaga Cathedral construction completed.
- 1741 – Yellow fever epidemic.
- 1757 – Ermita de Zamarrilla (church) built.
- 1782 – Málaga Cathedral construction completed.
- 1785 – Consulado (merchant guild) established.
- 1790 – Sociedad Económica de Amigos del País de Málaga active.

== Contemporary Period ==
=== 19th century ===
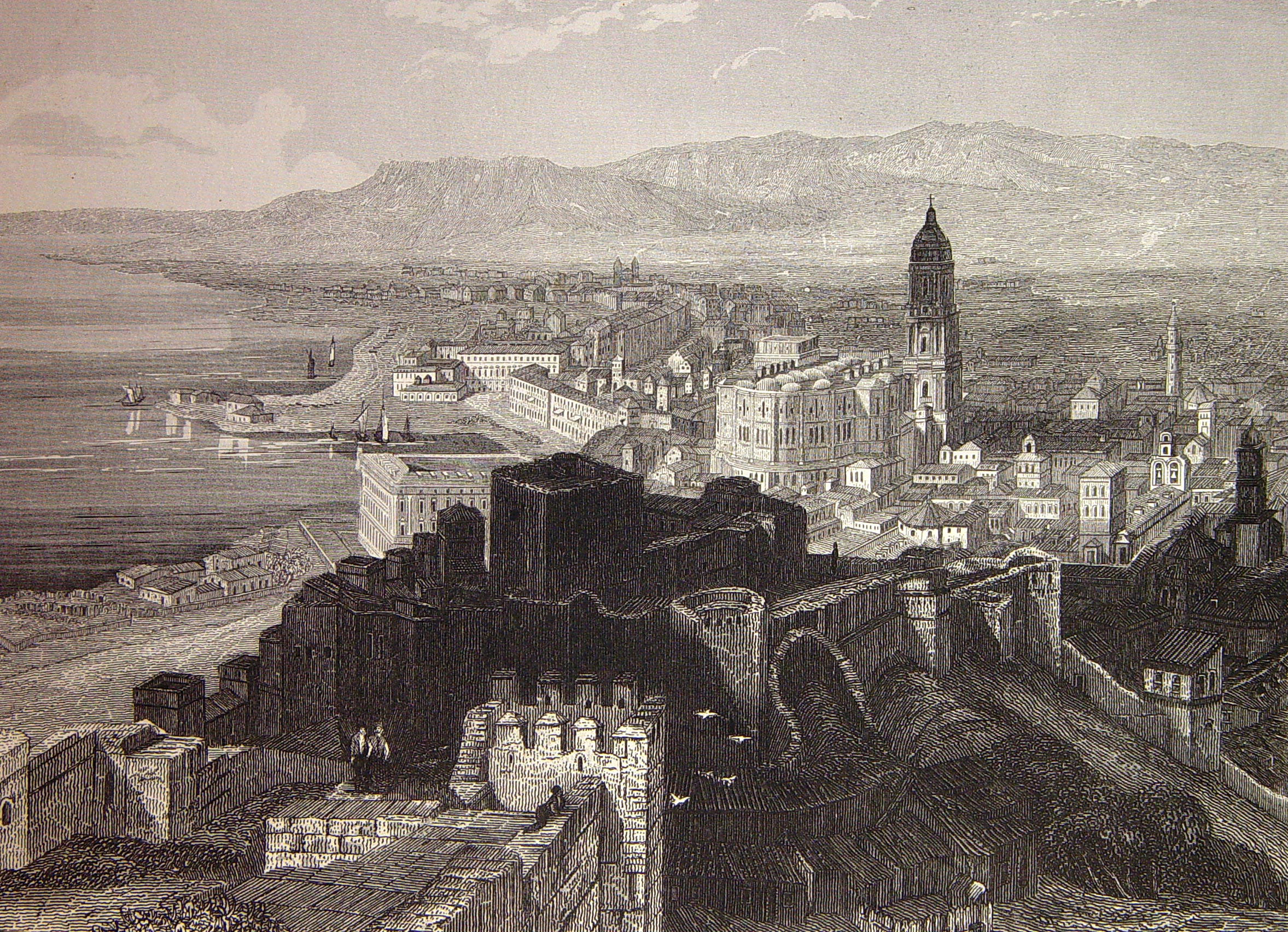
Málaga in the 19th century

- 1804 – Epidemic.
- 1810 – City "sacked by the French.(General Sebastiani"
- 1830 – Cementerio Ingles (cemetery) established.
- 1831 – 11 December: Execution of rebel José María de Torrijos y Uriarte.
- 1834 – Heredia's La Constancia (forge) iron finery forge begins operating.
- 1851 – Escuela Provincial de Bellas Artes (art school) opens.
- 1857 – Population: 94,293.
- 1854 – Bank of Málaga founded.
- 1862 – Córdoba-Málaga railway begins operating.
- 1864 – February: Arrest of a Polish ship with weapons and ammunition, organized by Polish émigré activists to support the ongoing Polish January Uprising in partitioned Poland (see also Poland–Spain relations).
- 1870 – Teatro Cervantes de Malaga (theatre) opens.
- 1876 – Plaza de toros de La Malagueta (bullring) built.
- 1877 – Population: 115,882.
- 1879 – Mercado de Atarazanas (market) built.
- 1881 – Pablo Picasso born in Malaga.
- 1885 – Socialista Malagueña founded.
- 1891
  - Calle Marqués de Larios (street) inaugurated.
  - English Church built on Avenida de Pries.
- 1897 – Sociedad Propagandística del Clima y Embellecimiento de Málaga established.
- 1899 – Monumento al Marqués de Larios (monument) erected.
- 1900 – Population: city 130,109; province 511,989.

=== 20th century ===
- 1904
  - Málaga Club de Fútbol ("The Anchovies") formed.
  - Villa Suecia built in El Limonar area.

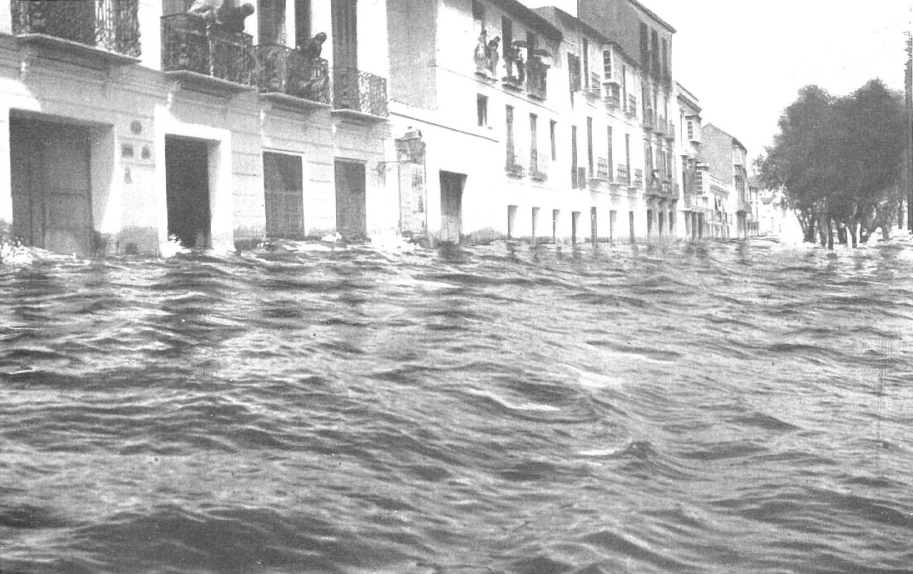
Flood in 1907

- 1907 – September: Flood.
- 1908 – Malaga-Vélez-Málaga railway begins operating.
- 1919 – Málaga Airport opens.
- 1913 – Museo Provincial de Bellas Artes (museum) founded.
- 1918 – Antigua casa de socorro de La Trinidad built.
- 1925 – Alameda Principal opens to traffic.
- 1937
  - February: Nationalists capture Malaga.
  - Boinas Rojas newspaper begins publication.
- 1940
  - La Tarde newspaper begins publication.
  - Population: 238,085.
- 1941 – La Rosaleda Stadium opens.
- 1945 – Cine Albeniz (cinema) opens.
- 1947 – Museo Arqueológico Provincial (museum) founded.
- 1949 – Carranque (Málaga) housing construction begins.

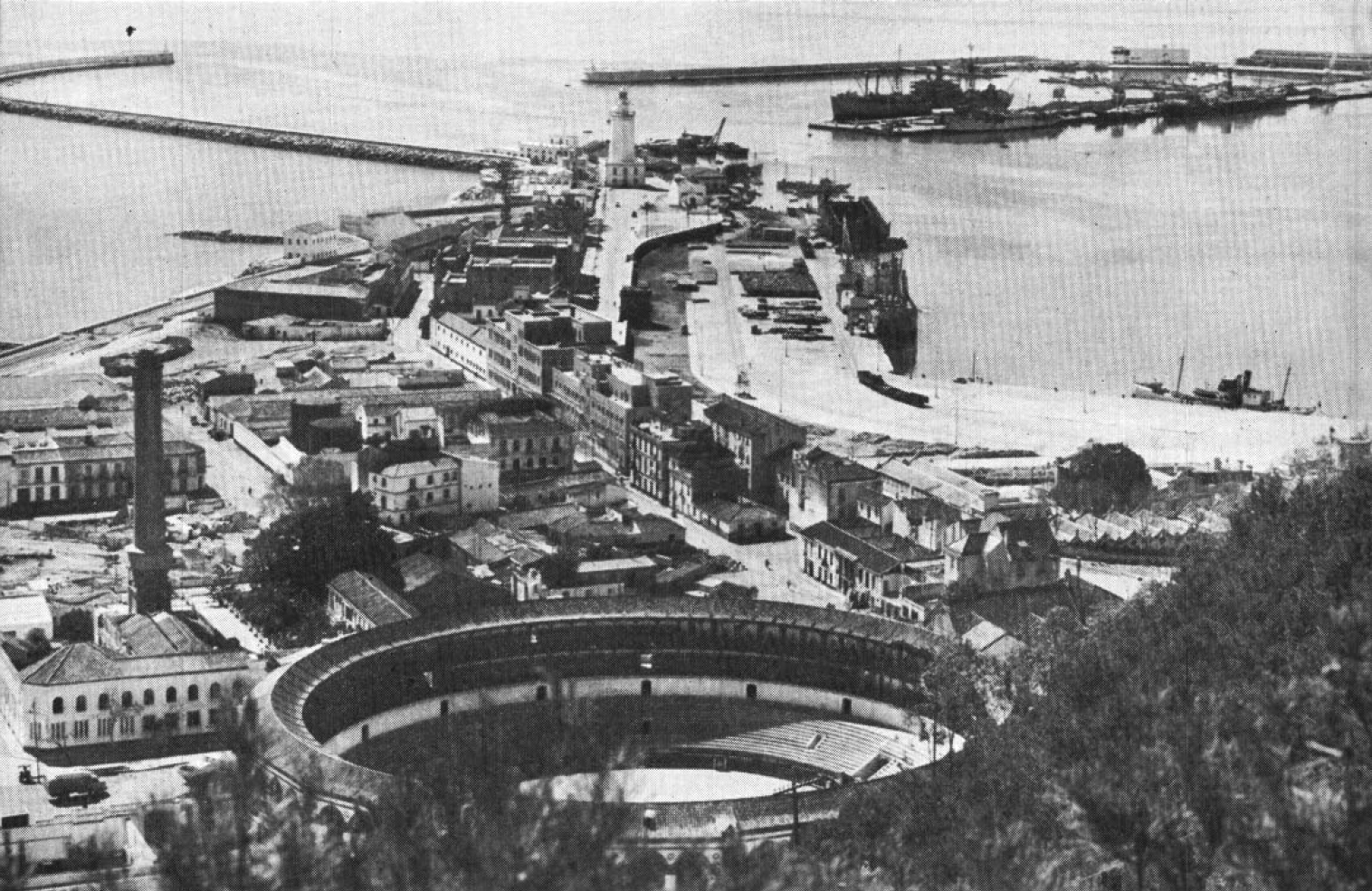
Port of Málaga, ca. 1961

- 1966 – Cine Astoria (cinema) opens.
- 1970 – Population: 374,452.
- 1972 – University of Málaga established.
- 1973 – Museo de Málaga established.
- 1976
  - Museo de Artes y Costumbres Populares (Málaga) (museum) opens.
  - Málaga Centro-Alameda railway station opens.
- 1979 – Pedro Aparicio Sánchez becomes mayor.
- 1981 – Population: 503,251.
- 1982 – 13 September: Spantax airplane crash.
- 1988
  - Fundación Picasso established.
  - Basílica de la Esperanza (Málaga) (church) built.
- 1991 – Orquesta Filarmónica de Málaga (orchestra) active.
- 1992
  - Andalusia Technology Park (science complex) opens.
  - Baloncesto Málaga (basketball team) formed.
- 1995 – Celia Villalobos becomes mayor.
- 1998 – Málaga Spanish Film Festival begins.
- 1999
  - La Opinión de Málaga begins publication.
  - Palacio de Deportes José María Martín Carpena (arena) opens.
- 2000
  - July: Politician Jose Maria Martin Carpena assassinated.
  - Francisco de la Torre (politician) becomes mayor.

=== 21st century ===
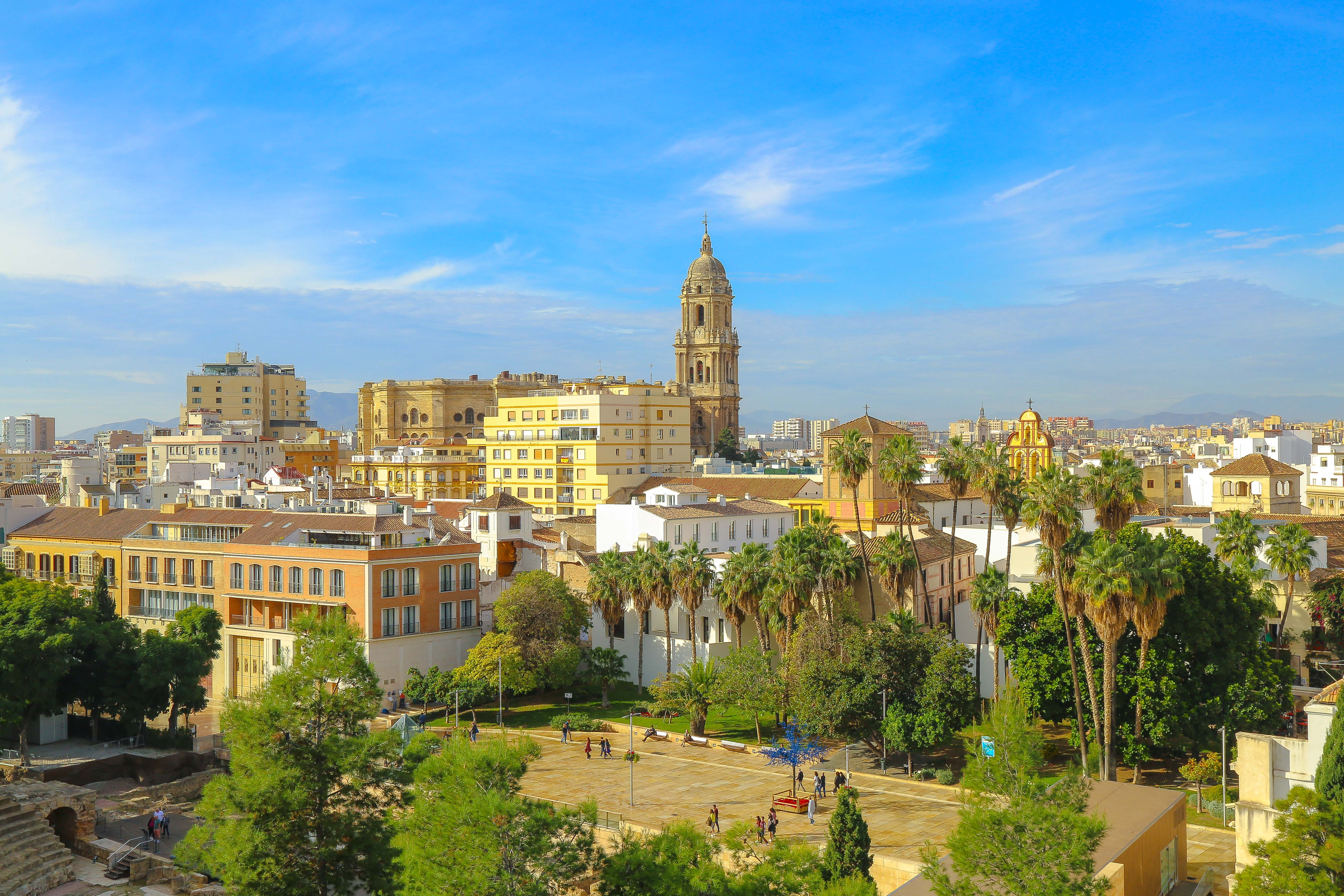
Málaga in 2017

- 2003
  - Málaga Metropolitan Transport Consortium established.
  - Museo Picasso Málaga opens.
- 2004 – Málaga Hoy magazine begins publication.
- 2006 – 2006 European Cup (athletics) held.
- 2009 – Honorary Consulate of Poland opened.
- 2010
  - 29 September: 2010 Spain general strike.
  - Population: 568,507.
- 2011 – Carmen Thyssen Museum opens.

== See also ==
- History of Málaga
- List of mayors of Malaga
- Timeline of the Muslim presence in the Iberian Peninsula, circa 8th-15th century CE
- Timelines of other cities in the autonomous community of Andalusia: Almería, Cádiz, Córdoba, Granada, Jaén, Jerez de la Frontera, Seville
- List of municipalities in Andalusia

== Bibliography ==
=== in English ===
Published in the 18th-19th centuries

- Francis Carter (1777), "(Malaga)", A Journey from Gibraltar to Malaga, London: Printed for T. Cadell, hdl:2027/nyp.33433081587358
- M.M. Noah (1819), "(Malaga)", Travels in England, France, Spain, and the Barbary States, New-York: Kirk and Mercein, hdl:2027/nyp.33433081557641, OCLC 1338665
- Josiah Conder (1830), "Malaga", The Modern Traveller, London: J.Duncan
- Richard Ford (1855). "Malaga.". A Handbook for Travellers in Spain (3rd ed.). London: J. Murray. OCLC 2145740.
- William Smith, ed. (1872) [1854]. "Malaca". Dictionary of Greek and Roman Geography. London: John Murray. hdl:2027/hvd.ah5cur.
- John Ramsay McCulloch (1880), "Malaga", in Hugh G. Reid (ed.), A Dictionary, Practical, Theoretical and Historical of Commerce and Commercial Navigation, London: Longmans, Green, and Co.
- John Lomas, ed. (1889). "Malaga.". O'Shea's Guide to Spain and Portugal (8th ed.). Edinburgh: Adam & Charles Black.

Published in the 20th century

- "Malaga". Spain and Portugal (3rd ed.). Leipsic: Karl Baedeker. 1908. OCLC 1581249.
- "Malaga (city)" . Encyclopædia Britannica. Vol. 17 (11th ed.). 1910. p. 460.
- Blanche M. Kelly (1910). "Malaga". Catholic Encyclopedia. New York.
- Évariste Lévi-Provençal (1934). "Malaga". Encyclopedia of Islam. Leiden: Brill. pp. 187–188. ISBN 9004097961.
- M Barke, M Newton. Promoting sustainable tourism in an urban context: recent developments in Malaga City, Andalusia. Journal of Sustainable Tourism, 1995.
- Trudy Ring, ed. (1996). "Malaga". Southern Europe. International Dictionary of Historic Places. Vol. 3. Fitzroy Dearborn. OCLC 31045650.

Published in the 21st century

- T. Goded; et al. (2008). "The 1494 and 1680 Málaga (southern Spain) earthquakes". Seismological Research Letters. 79 (5): 707–715. Bibcode:2008SeiRL..79..707G. doi:10.1785/gssrl.79.5.707.
- Bloom and Blair, ed. (2009). "Malaga". Grove Encyclopedia of Islamic Art & Architecture. Oxford University Press. p. 436. ISBN 978-0-19-530991-1.

=== in Spanish ===
- "Malaga", Diccionario geográfico-estadístico-histórico de España y sus posesiones de Ultramar (in Spanish), vol. 11, Madrid, 1848, pp. 66+, hdl:2027/mdp.39015039374171 (Historia section)
- Benito Vilá (1861). Guia del viajero en Málaga [Traveler's Guide to Malaga] (in Spanish). Ilustración Española.
