= Timeline of Jerez de la Frontera =

The following is a timeline of the history of the city of Jerez de la Frontera, Spain.

== Prior to 20th century ==
- 1261 - Siege of Jerez by forces of Christian Alfonso X of Castile.
- 1264 - Alfonso X in power.
- 1457 - Church of San Dionisio built (approximate date).
- 1484 - Church of San Miguel construction begins.
- 1575 - Town Hall construction begins on the Plaza de la Asunción.
- 1733 - Gremio de Vinatería de Jerez (guild of vintners) active.
- 1786 - Real Sociedad Económica de Amigos del País de Jerez de la Frontera (learned society) established.
- 1842 - Population: 33,104.
- 1869 - Acueducto de Tempul (aqueduct) begins operating.
- 1873 - Biblioteca Municipal de Jerez de la Frontera (library) opens.
- 1892 - 8 January: Jerez uprising peasant revolt
- 1900 - Population: 63,473.

== 20th century ==
- 1907 - Xerez FC (football club) formed.
- 1928 - Teatro Villamarta (theatre) opens.
- 1932 - Estadio Domecq (stadium) opens.
- 1939 - Sociedad de Estudios Históricos Jerezanos (historical society) incorporated.
- 1945 - Cementerio Nuestra Señora de La Merced (Jerez de la Frontera) (cemetery) established.
- 1947 - Xerez CD (football club) formed.
- 1948 - Cine Jerezano (cinema) established on the Plaza de San Andrés (Jerez de la Frontera).
- 1950 - Population: 107,770.
- 1957 - Cine Lealas (cinema) established.
- 1964 - Cine Delicias (cinema) established.
- 1970 - Population: 149,867.
- 1976 - Asociación Cultural Cine-Club Jerez formed.
- 1980 - Roman Catholic Diocese of Jerez de la Frontera established.
- 1984 - Diario de Jerez newspaper begins publication.
- 1985 - Circuito de Jerez motorsport circuit opens.
- 1988 - Estadio Municipal de Chapín (stadium) opens.
- 1989 - Onda Jerez TV begins broadcasting.

== 21st century ==
- 2001 - Population: 183,273.
- 2003 - María José García-Pelayo Jurado becomes mayor.
- 2011 - Population: 211,784.
- 2015 - Mamen Sánchez Díaz becomes mayor.

== See also ==
- Jerez de la Frontera history
- Timelines of other cities in the autonomous community of Andalusia: Almería, Cádiz, Córdoba, Granada, Jaén, Málaga, Seville
- List of municipalities in Andalusia

== Bibliography ==
=== in English ===
- Richard Ford (1890), "Jerez", Handbook for Travellers in Spain, vol. 2 (7th ed.), London: J. Murray, p. 401
- "Jeréz de la Frontera" . Encyclopædia Britannica. Vol. 15 (11th ed.). 1910. p. 325.
- "Jerez", Spain and Portugal (4th ed.), Leipzig: Karl Baedeker, 1913, p. 426, hdl:2027/uc2.ark:/13960/t5q81nw29 – via HathiTrust

=== in Spanish ===
- Joaquín Portillo (1839). Noches jerezanas, o sea la historia y descripción de la M. N. y M. L. ciudad de Jerez de la Frontera (in Spanish). Jerez: J. Mallen.
- Pascual Madoz, ed. (1850). "Jerez de la Frontera". Diccionario geográfico-estadístico-histórico de España y sus posesiones de Ultramar (in Spanish). Madrid.
- Agustín Muñoz y Gómez (1903). Noticia Historica de Las Calles y Plazas de Xerez de la Frontera: sus nombres y origenes (in Spanish).
