= John Murray III =

British publisher (1808–1892)

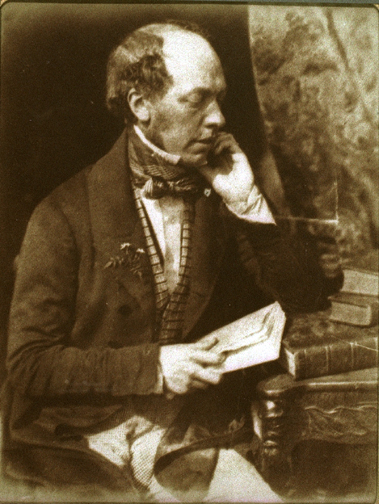
John Murray III

John Murray III (1808–1892) was a British publisher, third of the name at the John Murray company founded in London in 1777.

== Early life ==
The eldest son of John Murray II (1778–1843) by Anne Elliott, daughter of Charles Elliot, the Edinburgh publisher, he was born on 16 April 1808. When he was four years old, his father moved the firm to 50 Albemarle Street, which became a meeting-place for men of letters. He was educated at Charterhouse School and Edinburgh University, where he graduated in 1827. He completed his education by foreign travel, in Weimar delivering the dedication of Lord Byron's Marino Faliero to Goethe.

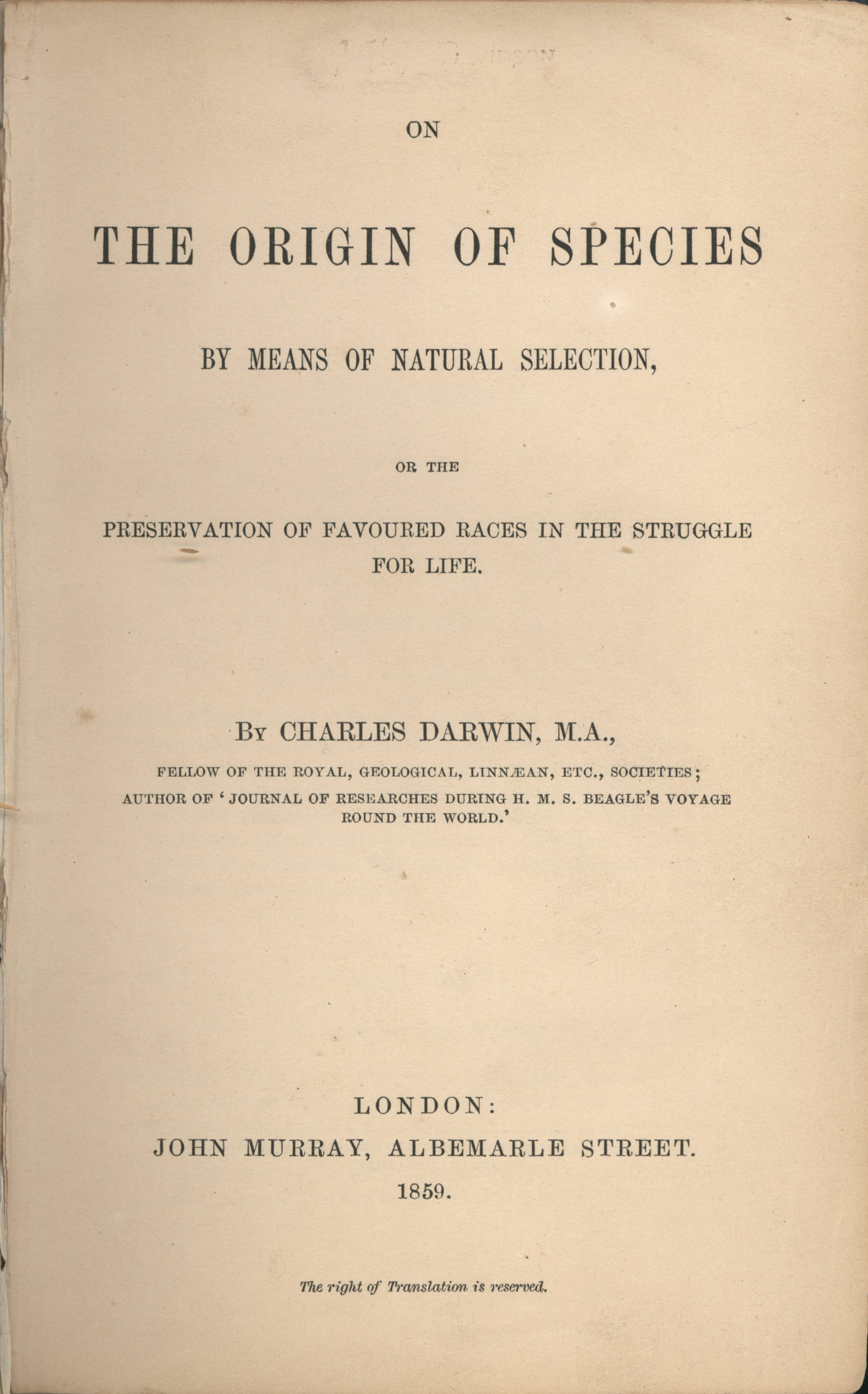

== Career ==
There resulted the research for a series of books for tourists, the Murray's Handbooks for Travellers. In 1836 Murray saw through the press the first of the handbooks, his own Holland, Belgium, and the Rhine; and three more were written by himself. Subsequently, he enlisted specialists: Richard Ford (A Handbook for Travellers in Spain), Sir Gardner Wilkinson (Egypt), and Sir Francis Palgrave (North Italy).

From 1830 to 1843 Murray helped his father run the firm. His own publishing projects included:

- Nineveh and its Remains (1848), publicising of Austen Henry Layard's discoveries;
- Lord Campbell's Lives of the Chancellors (1845–48), and Lives of the Chief Justices (1849);
- George Grote's History of Greece (1846–55);
- Murray's British Classics, annotated library editions of Byron, Gibbon, Goldsmith, and other writers; and
- the series of dictionaries by William Smith, an adviser of the firm who became editor of the Quarterly Review in 1867.

Darwin's On the Origin of Species was published by Murray in 1859. An enterprise of a different kind was The Speaker's Commentary (1871–81), prompted by John Evelyn Denison. Murray published anonymously in 1877 (2nd edit. 1878) Scepticism in Geology. Murray's Magazine, started in 1887, ran to 1891. The firm published numerous illustrated books of travels.

Murray had been well-connected in the literary world since his early days. He was a magistrate for Surrey.

== Personal life ==
Murray married in 1847 Marion, youngest daughter of Alexander Smith, banker, of Edinburgh, and sister of David Smith, writer to the signet. He left two sons, John and Hallam, who ran the family business, and two daughters.

Murray was a fellow of the Society of Antiquaries of London, and known as a member of the Athenæum Club. He died at 50 Albemarle Street on 2 April 1892. After a preliminary service in St. James's, Piccadilly, he was buried on 6 April in the parish church at Wimbledon, where he had resided for nearly 50 years.
