= Timeline of Jaén, Spain =

The following is a timeline of the history of the city of Jaén, Spain.

== Before 20th century ==
- 1002 - Baños árabes de Jaén (bath) constructed.
- 1225 - Siege of Jaén (1225).
- 1230 - Siege of Jaén (1230) by Castilian forces.
- 1234 - Úbeda capitulates on May 8, 1234.
- 1245 - Siege of Jaén (1245–46) begins.

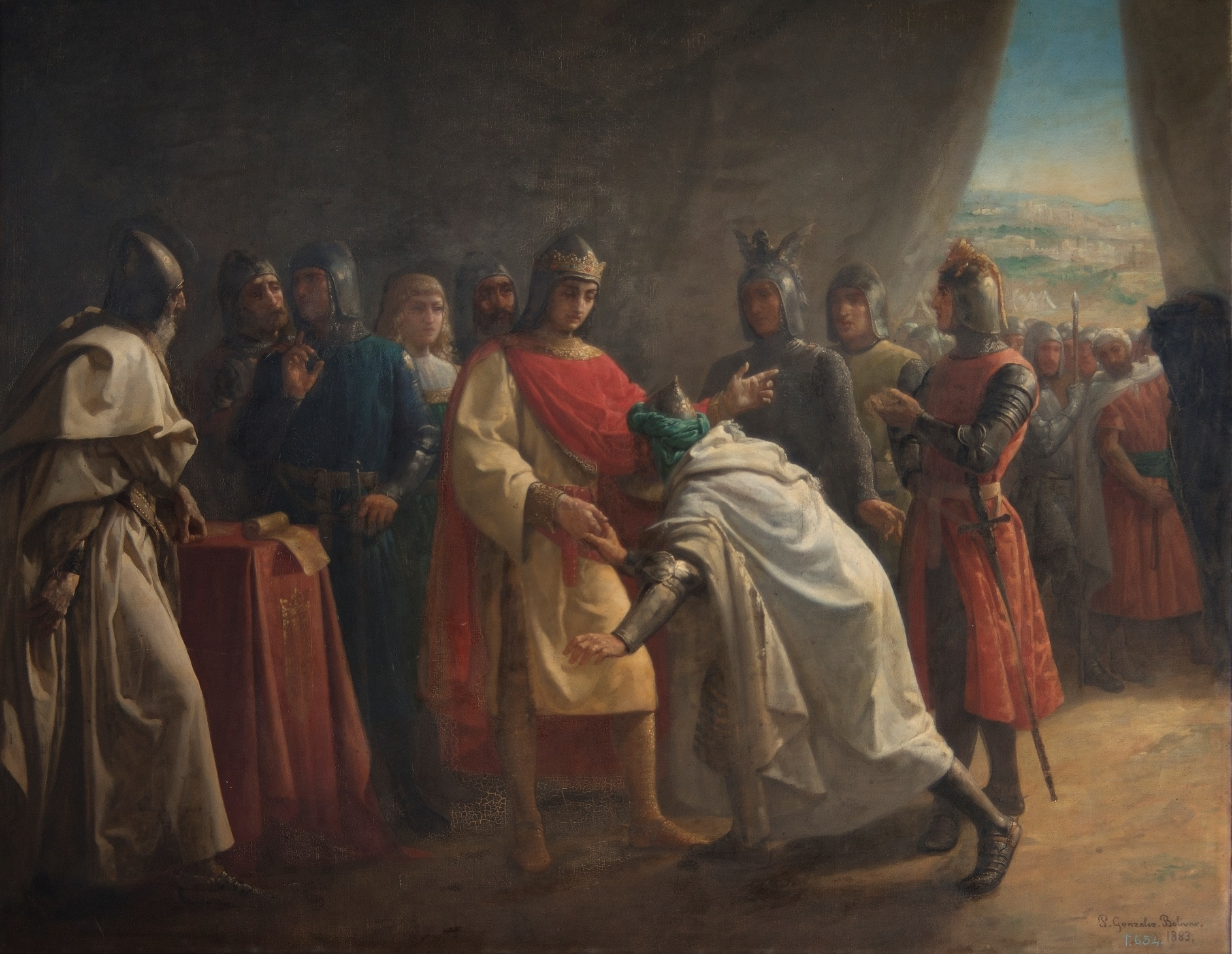
Muhammad I of Granada surrendering Jaén and becoming a vassal of Ferdinand III in 1246

- 1246 - Jaén becomes part of the Kingdom of Castile per the Treaty of Jaén.
- 1248 - Roman Catholic Diocese of Jaén established.
- 1712 - Earthquake.
- 1724 - Jaén Cathedral consecrated.
- 1727 - Iglesia de la Merced consecrated.
- 1786 - Real Sociedad Económica de Amigos del País de la Ciudad y Reino de Jaén established.
- 1813 - Diputación Provincial de Jaén founded.
- 1833 - City becomes part of the newly formed Province of Jaén.
- 1842 - Population: 17,387.
- 1895
  - Jaén Public Library established.
  - Palacio Provincial de Jaén built.
- 1900 - Population: 26,434.

== 20th century ==
- 1901 - Casa consistorial de Jaén (city hall) built (approximate date).
- 1907 - Teatro Cervantes (Jaén) (theatre) opens.
- 1922 - Real Jaén (football club) formed.
- 1927 - Teatro Darymelia (theatre) built.
- 1937 - 1 April: Bombing of Jaén by German forces.
- 1940 - Population: 54,631.
- 1941 - Diario Jaén newspaper begins publication.
- 1944 - Estadio de la Victoria (stadium) opens.
- 1949 - Estación de autobuses de Jaén (bus depot) built.
- 1958 - Premio Jaén piano competition begins.
- 1960 - Plaza de Toros de Jaén (bullring) built.
- 1969 - Museo Provincial de Jaén (museum) established.
- 1988 - Edificio del Banco de España (Jaén) built.
- 1989 - Iglesia de Belén y San Roque (church) built.
- 1990 - Museo de Artes y Costumbres Populares de Jaén (museum) opens.
- 1991
  - Centro comercial La Loma opens.
  - Population: 107,413
- 1993 - University of Jaén established.

== 21st century ==
- 2001 - Nuevo Estadio de La Victoria (stadium) opens.
- 2002 - Línea de alta velocidad Madrid-Alcázar de San Juan-Jaén (railway) construction begins.
- 2005 - Jaén Subterránea theatre festival begins.
- 2008 - Teatro Infanta Leonor (Jaén) (theatre) opens.
- 2011
  - Jaén Tram begins operating.
  - Population: 116,469.
- 2015 - Francisco Javier Márquez Sánchez becomes mayor.

== See also ==
- History of Jaén, Spain
- List of mayors of Jaén
- List of municipalities in Jaén province
- Timelines of other cities in the autonomous community of Andalusia: Almería, Cádiz, Córdoba, Granada, Jerez de la Frontera, Málaga, Seville

== Bibliography ==
- Richard Ford (1890), "Jaen", Handbook for Travellers in Spain, vol. 2 (7th ed.), London: J. Murray, p. 345
- "Jaen (town)" . Encyclopædia Britannica. Vol. 15 (11th ed.). 1910. p. 125.
- "Jaen", Spain and Portugal (4th ed.), Leipzig: Karl Baedeker, 1913, p. 365, hdl:2027/uc2.ark:/13960/t5q81nw29 – via HathiTrust
