= Timeline of Almería =

The following is a timeline of the history of the city of Almería, Spain.

== Prior to 20th century ==
- 955 CE – Town of Al-Mariyya established.
- 1012 – Taifa of Almería established.
- 1147 – Al-Mariyya taken by forces of Alfonso VII of León.
- 1157 – Almohads in power.
- 1238 – City becomes part of the kingdom of Granada.
- 1309 – City besieged by forces of James II of Aragon.^{(es)}
- 1489 – Castilians in power.
- 1492
  - Roman Catholic Diocese of Almería established.
  - Santo Domingo convent founded.
- 1524 – Almería Cathedral construction begins.
- 1591 – August: Battle of the Gulf of Almería (1591) fought offshore.
- 1674 – Iglesia de San Juan Evangelista (Almería) (church) built.
- 1829 – Teatro Principal (theatre) opens.
- 1834 – Almeria Sociedad Económica de los Amigos del País established.
- 1840 – Casino de Almería founded.
- 1842 – Population: 17,800.
- 1845 – Biblioteca del Instituto Provincial de Segunda Enseñanza de Almería (library) established.
- 1860 – Crónica Meridional newspaper begins publication.
- 1873 – 30 July: Battle of Almería (1873).
- 1881 – Teatro Apolo (Almería) (theatre) built.
- 1885 – Ingenio de Montserrat (sugar mill) begins operating.
- 1887 – Escuela de Artes y Oficios (art school) founded.
- 1888 – Plaza de toros de Almería (bullring) opens.
- 1892 – Mercado Central de Almería (market) built.
- 1893 – Estación de Almería (train station) built.
- 1900 – Population: 47,326.

== 20th century ==
- 1908 – La Independencia newspaper begins publication.
- 1909 – Casa de las Mariposas (Almería) built on the Puerta de Purchena.
- 1916 – Diario de Almería newspaper begins publication.
- 1921 – Círculo Mercantil e Industrial (Almería) built.
- 1932 – Archivo Histórico Provincial de Almería (archives) established.
- 1933 – Museum of Almería founded.
- 1937 – 31 May: Bombardment of Almería by German forces.
- 1939 – La Voz de Almería newspaper begins publication.
- 1947
  - Biblioteca Francisco Villaespesa (library) active.
  - Iglesia de San Antonio de Padua (Almería) (church) built in the Ciudad Jardín (Almería) barrio.
- 1968 – Almería Airport begins operating.
- 1970 – Population: 114,510.
- 1971 – AD Almería (football club) formed.
- 1976 – Estadio Municipal Juan Rojas (stadium) opens.
- 1980 – Almerían Studies Institute founded.
- 1989 – UD Almería (football club) formed.
- 1992 – Centro Andaluz de la Fotografía established.
- 1993 – University of Almería established.
- 1997 – Coro Ciudad de Almería (musical group) formed.

== 21st century ==
- 2001
  - Orquesta Ciudad de Almería (orchestra) formed.
  - Population: 166,328.
- 2003
  - Ibn Tufayl Foundation for Arabic Studies established.
  - Luis Rogelio Rodríguez-Comendador becomes mayor.
- 2004 – Estadio de los Juegos Mediterráneos (stadium) opens.
- 2005 – 2005 Mediterranean Games held in Almeria.
- 2007 – Consorcio de Transporte Metropolitano del Área de Almería (transit entity) created.
- 2011 – Population: 189,680.
- 2014 – Population: 193,351 city; 257,207 metro.
- 2015 – Ramón Fernández-Pacheco becomes mayor.

== See also ==
- History of Almería
- List of emirs of Almería in 11th century CE
- List of mayors of Almería
- List of municipalities in Almería
- Timelines of other cities in the autonomous community of Andalusia: Cádiz, Córdoba, Granada, Jaén, Jerez de la Frontera, Málaga, Seville

== Bibliography ==
=== in English ===
- Richard Ford (1890), "Almeria", Handbook for Travellers in Spain (7th ed.), London: J. Murray, p. 374
- Richard Stephen Charnock (1894), "Almeria", Bradshaw's Illustrated Hand-book to Spain and Portugal, W.J. Adams & Sons, OCLC 36885426
- "Almería (capital)" . Encyclopædia Britannica. Vol. 1 (11th ed.). 1910. p. 714.
- "Almeria", Spain and Portugal (4th ed.), Leipzig: Karl Baedeker, 1913, hdl:2027/uc2.ark:/13960/t5q81nw29 – via HathiTrust
- Jacinto Bosch Vilá (1989). "Al-Mariyya". Encyclopedia of Islam. Leiden: Brill. pp. 575–577. ISBN 9004083693.

=== in Spanish ===
- Leopoldo Torres Balbás (1957), "Almería islamica", Al-Andalus (in Spanish), vol. 22, pp. 217–263 – via Technical University of Madrid, Archivo Digital UPM
- José Ángel Tapia Garrido (1970). Almeria, piedra a piedra (in Spanish).
- Historia general de Almeria y su provincia (in Spanish), 1976
- José Ángel Tapia Garrido (1986), Almería musulmana [Muslim Almería] (in Spanish)
- Donato Gómez Díaz; José Miguel Martínez López (2001). El deporte en Almería, 1880-1939: Una historia sobre el ocio y la formación de la identidad provincial [Sports in Almería, 1880-1939: A history of recreation and provincial identity formation] (in Spanish). Universidad de Almería. ISBN 978-84-8240-341-0.
- Josefa Martínez Romero (2001). Instituciones culturales en el siglo XIX almeriense (in Spanish). Universidad de Almería. ISBN 978-84-8240-333-5.
- Ignacio Ortega Campos (2005), Crónica social del cine en Almería (1896-1936) (in Spanish), Fundación Unicaja, ISBN 9788495979452
