= Gabriel Díaz =

Gabriel Díaz may refer to:

- Gabriel Díaz (footballer) (born 1989), Argentine footballer
- Gabriel Díaz Bessón (1590–1638), Spanish composer
- Gabriel Díaz Vara Calderón (1621–1676), Spanish bishop
- Gabriel Díaz Berbel (1940–2011), Spanish politician

== See also ==
- Gabriela Díaz (born 1981), Argentine cyclist
- Gabriel Dias (disambiguation)
