= Murray's Handbooks for Travellers =

Travel guides published in London, from 1836

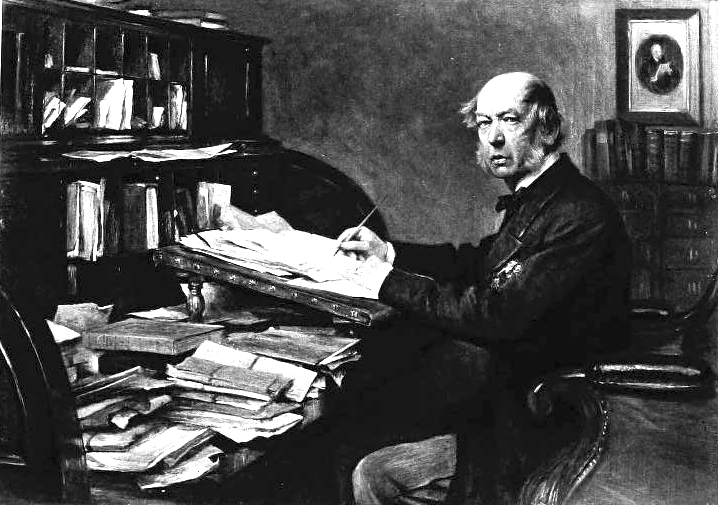
Portrait of publisher John Murray III, 19th century

Murray's Handbooks for Travellers were travel guide books published in London by John Murray beginning in 1836. The series covered tourist destinations in Europe and parts of Asia and northern Africa. According to scholar James Buzard, the Murray style "exemplified the exhaustive rational planning that was as much an ideal of the emerging tourist industry as it was of British commercial and industrial organization generally". The guidebooks became popular enough to appear in works of fiction such as Charles Lever's Dodd Family Abroad. After 1915 the series continued as the Blue Guides and the familiar gold-gilded red Murray's Handbooks published by John Murray London including the long running Handbook to India, Pakistan, Ceylon & Burma which concluded with the 21st edition in 1968 before changing from the original format of 1836 to a more modern paperback edition of 1975.

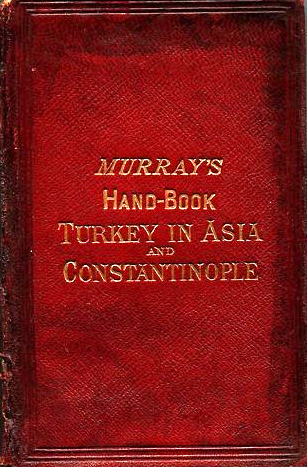
Cover of Handbook for Travellers in Turkey, 1871

== List of Murray's Handbooks by date of publication ==
=== 1830s ===
- A Hand-Book for Travellers on the Continent (Northern Germany) (1st ed.), London: John Murray and Son, 1836, OCLC 1039483584
- A Hand-Book for Travellers on the Continent (Southern Germany) (1st ed.), London: John Murray and Son, 1837
- A Handbook for Travellers in Switzerland (1st ed.), London: J. Murray and Son, 1838, OCLC 794649338
- A Hand-Book for Travellers on the Continent (Northern Germany) (2nd ed.), London: John Murray and Son, 1838, OCLC 2030550, OL 22881568M
- A Hand-Book for Travellers on the Continent (Northern Germany) (3rd ed.), London: J. Murray and Son, 1839, OL 23546118M

=== 1840s ===
- A Hand-Book for Travellers in the Ionian Islands, Greece, Turkey, Asia Minor, and Constantinople, London: J. Murray, 1840, OCLC 397597, OL 6952607M (Index)
- A Hand-Book for Travellers on the Continent (Northern Germany) (4th ed.), London: J. Murray, 1841, OCLC 222901979
- Handbook for Travellers in Central Italy, London: J. Murray and Son, 1843, OL 6597087M
- Richard Ford (1845), A Handbook for Travellers in Spain, London: J. Murray
- A Hand-book for Travellers in the Ionian Islands, Greece, Turkey, Asia Minor, and Constantinople (2nd ed.), London: J. Murray, 1845, OCLC 397597, OL 6952607M
- A Hand-Book for Travellers on the Continent (Northern Germany) (5th ed.), London: J. Murray, 1845, OCLC 2172798, OL 6569519M
- Gardner Wilkinson (1847), Hand-book for Travellers in Egypt, J. Murray, OCLC 23931478, OL 23544285M
- Hand-book for Travellers in France (3rd ed.), London: Murray, 1848, OL 24506192M
- Hand-book for Northern Europe, London: John Murray, 1849 v.2 Finland and Russia

=== 1850s ===
- Octavian Blewitt (1850), A Hand-book for Travellers in central Italy (2nd ed.), London: J. Murray, OCLC 5719060, OL 23378143M
- Peter Cunningham (1850), Handbook of London, London: John Murray, OCLC 4773921, OL 23302727M
- A Hand-book for Travellers in Devon & Cornwall .., London: J. Murray, 1851, OCLC 2169402, OL 6924165M
- Murray's Handbook for Modern London, London: John Murray, 1851, OCLC 9005002, OL 6927395M
- Murray's Handbook for Belgium and the Rhine, London: J. Murray, 1852, OL 23365744M
- Handbook for Travellers in Central Italy (3rd ed.), London: J. Murray, 1853, OCLC 2300845, OL 6940345M
- Handbook for Travellers in Greece, London: J. Murray, 1854, OL 23389359M
- A Handbook for Travellers in Turkey (3rd ed.), London: J. Murray, 1854, OCLC 2145740, OL 6952606M
- Richard Ford (1855), A Handbook for Travellers in Spain (3rd ed.), London: J. Murray, OCLC 2145740
- Handbook for Travellers in Central Italy (4th ed.), London: J. Murray, 1857, OL 23378142M
- A Handbook for Travellers in France (6th ed.), London: J. Murray, 1858, OCLC 6774411, OL 23378145M
- A Handbook for Travellers in Kent and Sussex, London: J. Murray, 1858, OL 7165074M
- Handbook for Travellers in Syria and Palestine, London: J. Murray, 1858, OCLC 2300777, OL 6940723M
- Handbook for Travellers in Wiltshire, Dorsetshire and Somersetshire, London: J. Murray, 1859, OCLC 2016234, OL 23378146M
- A Handbook for India, London: J. Murray, 1859, OCLC 4366789, OL 6953785M

=== 1860s ===
- A Handbook for Travellers in Berks, Bucks, and Oxfordshire, London: J. Murray, 1860, OCLC 2099710, OL 6924857M
- A Handbook for Travellers in South Wales, London: J. Murray, 1860, OCLC 2094865, OL 6924864M
- A Handbook for Travellers in France (8th ed.), London: J. Murray, 1861, OL 24627024M
- Handbook for Travellers in Ireland (2nd ed.), London: J. Murray, 1866, OCLC 2013636, OL 6936234M
- A Handbook of Rome and its Environs (8th ed.), London: J. Murray, 1867, OCLC 4038432, OL 23302746M
- A Handbook for Travellers in North Wales (3rd ed.), London: J. Murray, 1868, OCLC 2109683, OL 6924865M
- Hand-book for Travellers in Russia, Poland, and Finland (2nd ed.), London: J. Murray, 1868, OL 23414674M
- A Handbook for Travellers in Southern Italy (6th ed.), London: J. Murray, 1868, OL 23389358M
- A Hand-book for Travellers on the Continent (16th ed.), London: J. Murray, 1868, OL 23423054M
- Handbook for Westmorland, Cumberland, and the lakes (2nd ed.), London: J. Murray, 1869, OCLC 5358890

=== 1870s ===
- Handbook for Essex, Suffolk, Norfolk, and Cambridgeshire .., London: J. Murray, 1870, OL 14010753M
- Handbook for Shropshire, Cheshire and Lancashire, London: J. Murray, 1870, OCLC 2109674, OL 6924861M
- A Handbook for Travellers on the Continent: Being a Guide to Holland, Belgium, Prussia, Northern Germany, and the Rhine from Holland to Switzerland (17th ed.), London: J. Murray, 1871, OCLC 5358857, OL 6936276M
- Handbook to London as it is, London: J. Murray, 1871, OCLC 2157993, OL 6616496M
- A Handbook for Travellers in Gloucestershire, Worcestershire, and Herefordshire .., London: J. Murray, 1872, OCLC 2167311, OL 6924859M
- Handbook for Essex, Suffolk, Norfolk, and Cambridgeshire (2nd ed.), London: J. Murray, 1875, OCLC 2094145, OL 6924844M
- Handbook for Travellers in Portugal (3rd ed.), London: J. Murray, 1875
- Handbook for Travellers in Scotland (4th ed.), London: J. Murray, 1875, OCLC 4658476, OL 6933923M
- Handbook for Travellers in Holland and Belgium (19th ed.), London: Murray, 1876, OCLC 221452961, OL 24606062M
- James Thorne (1876), Handbook to the environs of London, London: John Murray, OL 16337277M
- Handbook for England and Wales, London: J. Murray, 1878, OCLC 2167328, OL 6924856M
- Handbook of the Madras Presidency (2nd ed.), London: J. Murray, 1879, OL 23389366M (Includes guide to Madras City)
- Handbook for visitors to Paris, London: Murray, 1879, OL 24363358M
- Handbook to London as it is, London: J. Murray, 1879, OL 24437368M

=== 1880s ===
- Handbook for Lancashire, London: J. Murray, 1880, OCLC 2167424, OL 6924853M
- Handbook of the Bombay Presidency with an Account of Bombay City (2nd ed.), London: J. Murray, 1881, OCLC 2094004, OL 6531525M
- Handbook of the Bengal Presidency with an Account of Calcutta City, London: J. Murray, 1882, OCLC 2093946, OL 6531524M
- Handbook for Travellers in Yorkshire (3rd ed.), London: J. Murray, 1882, OCLC 2096198, OL 6924849M
- R. Lambert Playfair (1882), Handbook to the Mediterranean (2nd revised ed.), London: John Murray Pt. 1
- Handbook for Travellers in Denmark, with Sleswig and Holstein, and Iceland (5th ed.), London: J. Murray, 1883
- Handbook for Travellers in Greece (5th ed.), London: J. Murray, 1884, OCLC 2832159, OL 6949054M
- A Handbook of Rome and its Environs (14th ed.), London: J. Murray, 1888, OL 23378173M

=== 1890s ===
- R. Lambert Playfair (1890), Handbook for Travellers in Algeria and Tunis (4th ed.), London: J. Murray, OCLC 12720545, OL 14045975M
- Handbook for Travellers in Derbyshire, Nottinghamshire, Leicestershire, and Staffordshire .. (3rd ed.), London: J. Murray, 1892, OCLC 2097091, OL 6924846M
- R. Lambert Playfair (1892), Handbook to the Mediterranean (3rd revised ed.), London: John Murray, OCLC 6853896 Pt.1; Pt. 2
- R. Lambert Playfair (1895), Handbook for Travellers in Algeria and Tunis (5th ed.), London: J. Murray, OCLC 4443952, OL 6953677M
- Charles Wilson, ed. (1895), Handbook for Travellers in Asia Minor, Transcaucasia, Persia, etc, London: J. Murray, ISBN 9780524062142, OCLC 8979039 (online at Open Library)
- Hand-book for Travellers in Northern Italy (16th ed.), London: J. Murray, 1897, OCLC 2231483, OL 6936521M
- A Handbook of Rome and the Campagna (16th ed.), London: J. Murray, 1899, OCLC 2031002, OL 6947400M

=== 1900s ===
- Handbook for Travellers in Greece (7th ed.), London: Murray, 1900, OL 24368063M
- Basil Hall Chamberlain; W.B. Mason (1901), A Handbook for Travellers in Japan (6th ed.), London: J. Murray, OCLC 2463325, OL 6991294M
- Basil Hall Chamberlain; W.B. Mason (1903), A Handbook for Travellers in Japan (7th ed.), London: J. Murray, OL 25302448M
- Handbook for Travellers in South Germany and Austria (15th ed.). London: J. Murray. 1903 – via Internet Archive. + Index
- John Cooke (1906), Handbook for Travellers in Ireland (7th ed.), London: Edward Stanford, OL 24591180M (cover title: Murray's Handbook Ireland)
- Basil Hall Chamberlain; W.B. Mason (1907), A Handbook for Travellers in Japan including the whole empire from Saghalien to Formosa (8th ed.), London: J. Murray, OCLC 1329108, OL 6991983M
- Handbook for Travellers in Constantinople, Brûsa, and the Troad, London: J. Murray, 1907

=== 1910s ===
- A Handbook for Travellers in India, Burma, and Ceylon (8th ed.), London: J. Murray, 1911, OL 23302766M via HathiTrust. + (Index)

== List of Murray's Handbooks by geographic coverage ==
=== Algeria ===
- A handbook for travellers in Algeria, London: John Murray, 1874 Digitized version
- R. Lambert Playfair (1882), Handbook to the Mediterranean (2nd revised ed.), London: John Murray Pt. 1
- R. Lambert Playfair (1887), Handbook for Travellers in Algeria and Tunis; Algiers, Oran, Constantine, Carthage, etc. (3rd ed.), London: J. Murray
- R. Lambert Playfair (1890), Handbook for Travellers in Algeria and Tunis (4th ed.), London: J. Murray, OCLC 12720545, OL 14045975M
- R. Lambert Playfair (1892), Handbook to the Mediterranean (3rd ed.), London: John Murray Pt. 1
- R. Lambert Playfair (1895), Handbook for Travellers in Algeria and Tunis (5th ed.), London: J. Murray, OCLC 4443952, OL 6953677M

=== Belgium ===
- Murray's Handbook for Belgium and the Rhine, London: J. Murray, 1852, OL 23365744M
- Handbook for Travellers in Holland and Belgium (19th ed.), London: Murray, 1876, OCLC 221452961, OL 24606062M
- Handbook for Travellers in Holland and Belgium (20th ed.), London: John Murray, 1881 – via HathiTrust

=== Egypt ===
- Gardner Wilkinson (1847), Hand-book for Travellers in Egypt, J. Murray, OCLC 23931478, OL 23544285M

=== France ===
- Hand-book for Travellers in France (3rd ed.), London: Murray, 1848, OL 24506192M
- A Handbook for Travellers in France (6th ed.), London: J. Murray, 1858, OCLC 6774411, OL 23378145M
- A Handbook for Travellers in France (8th ed.), London: J. Murray, 1861, OL 24627024M + Index
- Handbook for visitors to Paris, London: Murray, 1879, OL 24363358M

=== Germany ===
- Hand-Book for Travellers on the Continent: Being a Guide through Holland, Belgium, Prussia and Northern Germany, and Along the Rhine (2nd ed.), London: J. Murray, 1838, OCLC 2030550
  - Handbook for Travellers on the Continent: Being a Guide to Holland, Belgium, Prussia, Northern Germany, and the Rhine from Holland to Switzerland (17th ed.), London: J. Murray, 1871, OCLC 5358857, OL 6936276M
- Handbook for Travellers in Southern Germany, Murray's handbooks (3rd ed.), London: J. Murray, 1844
  - Handbook for Travellers in Southern Germany (9th ed.), London: J. Murray, 1863 + Index
  - 1871 ed. + Index
- Murray's Handbook for Belgium and the Rhine, London: J. Murray, 1852, OL 23365744M + Index
- Handbook for North Germany. London: J. Murray. 1877. + Index
  - Handbook for North Germany. Murray's hand-book Rhine & North Germany (20th ed.). London: J. Murray. 1886 – via HathiTrust.
- Handbook for Travellers in South Germany and Austria (15th ed.). London: J. Murray. 1903. + Index
  - Google books version + Index

=== Great Britain ===
==== England ====
- Handbook for England and Wales, London: J. Murray, 1878, OCLC 2167328, OL 6924856M
  - 1890 ed.

===== East Midlands region =====
- Handbook for Travellers in Derbyshire, Nottinghamshire, Leicestershire, and Staffordshire (3rd ed.), London: J. Murray, 1892, OCLC 2097091, OL 6924846M + Index
  - 1874 ed.
- Handbook for Northamptonshire and Rutland (2nd ed.), London, Edwards Stanford, 1901.

===== East of England region =====
- Handbook for Essex, Suffolk, Norfolk, and Cambridgeshire, London: J. Murray, 1870, OL 14010753M
  - Handbook for Essex, Suffolk, Norfolk, and Cambridgeshire (2nd ed.), London: J. Murray, 1875, OCLC 2094145, OL 6924844M + Index
- Handbook for Hertfordshire, Bedfordshire, and Huntingdonshire. Murray's handbooks. London: J. Murray. 1895.

===== London region =====
- Peter Cunningham (1850), Handbook of London, London: John Murray, OCLC 4773921, OL 23302727M
- Murray's Handbook for Modern London, London: John Murray, 1851, OCLC 9005002, OL 6927395M
- Handbook to London as it is, London: J. Murray, 1871, OCLC 2157993, OL 6616496M
- James Thorne (1876), Handbook to the Environs of London, London: John Murray, OL 16337277M
- Handbook to London as it is, London: J. Murray, 1879, OL 24437368M + index

===== North West England region =====
- Handbook for Lancashire, London: J. Murray, 1880, OCLC 2167424, OL 6924853M
- Handbook for Westmorland, Cumberland, and the lakes (2nd ed.), London: J. Murray, 1869, OCLC 5358890

===== South East England region =====
- A Handbook for Travellers in Kent and Sussex, London: J. Murray, 1858, OL 7165074M
  - 1868 (3rd) edition
- Handbook for Travellers in Kent (4th ed.). London: J. Murray. 1877.
- A Handbook for Travellers in Surrey, Hampshire, and the Isle of Wight (3rd ed.), London: John Murray, 1876
- A Handbook for Travellers in Berks, Bucks, and Oxfordshire, London: J. Murray, 1860, OCLC 2099710, OL 6924857M
  - 1882 ed.
- Murray's Cyclist's Roadbook: from London through Guildford, Chichester, Portsmouth, and Southampton to the New Forest and back by Romsey, Winchester, Guildford, Dorking, and Epsom. Murray's handbook. London: J. Murray. 1897.
- Handbook for Travellers in the Isle of Wight (5th ed.), London: J. Murray, 1898, hdl:2027/njp.32101072878026

===== South West England region =====
- A Hand-book for Travellers in Devon & Cornwall, London: J. Murray, 1851, OCLC 2169402, OL 6924165M
- Handbook for Travellers in Wiltshire, Dorsetshire and Somersetshire, London: J. Murray, 1859, OCLC 2016234, OL 23378146M. Index
  - Handbook for Travellers in Wiltshire, Dorsetshire, and Somersetshire (4th ed.), London: John Murray, 1882 + Index
- Handbook for Travellers in Devon (11th ed.), London: J. Murray, 1895, hdl:2027/nyp.33433075903538 + Index

===== West Midlands region =====
- Handbook for Shropshire, Cheshire and Lancashire, London: J. Murray, 1870, OCLC 2109674, OL 6924861M
- Handbook for Travellers in Gloucestershire, Worcestershire, and Herefordshire, London: J. Murray, 1872, OCLC 2167311, OL 6924859M + Index
- Handbook of Warwickshire. London: J. Murray. 1899.

===== Yorkshire and the Humber region =====
- Handbook for Travellers in Yorkshire (3rd ed.), London: J. Murray, 1882, OCLC 2096198, OL 6924849M + Index
  - Handbook for Yorkshire (4th ed.). London: Edward Stanford. 1904. + Index

==== Scotland ====
- Handbook for Travellers in Scotland (4th ed.), London: J. Murray, 1875, OCLC 4658476, OL 6933923M

==== Wales ====
- A Handbook for Travellers in South Wales, London: J. Murray, 1860, OCLC 2094865, OL 6924864M
- A Handbook for Travellers in North Wales (3rd ed.), London: J. Murray, 1868, OCLC 2109683, OL 6924865M

=== Greece ===
- A Hand-book for Travellers in the Ionian Islands, Greece, Turkey, Asia Minor, and Constantinople, London: J. Murray, 1840, OCLC 397597, OL 6952607M
- A Hand-book for Travellers in the Ionian Islands, Greece, Turkey, Asia Minor, and Constantinople (2nd ed.), London: J. Murray, 1845, OCLC 397597, OL 6952607M + Index
- Handbook for Travellers in Greece, London: J. Murray, 1854, OL 23389359M
- Handbook for Travellers in Greece (4th ed.), London: J. Murray, 1872
- R. Lambert Playfair (1882), Handbook to the Mediterranean (2nd revised ed.), London: John Murray Pt. 1
- Handbook for Travellers in Greece (5th ed.), London: J. Murray, 1884, OCLC 2832159, OL 6949054M
- Handbook for Travellers in Greece (7th ed.), London: Murray, 1900, OL 24368063M

=== India ===
- A Handbook for India, London: J. Murray, 1859, OCLC 4366789, OL 6953785M
- Handbook of the Madras Presidency (2nd ed.), London: J. Murray, 1879, OL 23389366M (Includes guide to Madras City)
- Handbook of the Bombay Presidency with an Account of Bombay City (2nd ed.), London: J. Murray, 1881, OCLC 2094004, OL 6531525M + Index
- Handbook of the Bengal Presidency with an Account of Calcutta City, London: J. Murray, 1882, OCLC 2093946, OL 6531524M + Index
- A Handbook for Travellers in India and Ceylon, London: J. Murray, 1892
- A Handbook for Travellers in India, Burma, and Ceylon (5th ed.), London: J. Murray, 1906
  - A Handbook for Travellers in India, Burma, and Ceylon (8th ed.), London: J. Murray, 1911, OL 23302766M + Index

=== Ireland ===
- Handbook for Travellers in Ireland (2nd ed.), London: J. Murray, 1866, OCLC 2013636, OL 6936234M + Index
- John Cooke (1906), Handbook for Travellers in Ireland (7th ed.), London: Edward Stanford, OL 24591180M + Index (Cover title: Murray's Handbook Ireland)

=== Italy ===
- Handbook for Travellers in Central Italy, London: J. Murray and Son, 1843, OL 6597087M
  - Octavian Blewitt (1850), Hand-book for Travellers in Central Italy (2nd ed.), London: J. Murray, OCLC 5719060, OL 23378143M
  - Handbook for Travellers in Central Italy (3rd ed.), London: J. Murray, 1853, OCLC 2300845, OL 6940345M
  - Handbook for Travellers in Central Italy (4th ed.), London: J. Murray, 1857, OL 23378142M
- Handbook for Travellers in North Italy, London: John Murray, 1842
  - Hand-book for Travellers in Northern Italy (3rd ed.), London: John Murray, 1847
  - Hand-book for Travellers in Northern Italy (4th ed.), London: John Murray, 1852
  - Hand-book for Travellers in Northern Italy (10th ed.), London: John Murray, 1866
  - Hand-book for Travellers in Northern Italy (16th ed.), London: J. Murray, 1897, OCLC 2231483, OL 6936521M + Index
- Handbook of Florence and its Environs, London: J. Murray, 1867
- A Handbook of Rome and its Environs (8th ed.), London: J. Murray, 1867, OCLC 4038432, OL 23302746M
  - A Handbook of Rome and its Environs (14th ed.), London: J. Murray, 1888, OL 23378173M
  - A Handbook of Rome and the Campagna (16th ed.), London: J. Murray, 1899, OCLC 2031002, OL 6947400M
- Handbook for Travellers in Southern Italy (6th ed.), London: J. Murray, 1868, OL 23389358M
  - Handbook for Travellers in Southern Italy (8th ed.), London: J. Murray, 1878

=== Japan ===
- Ernest Mason Satow; A. G. S. Hawes (1884). Handbook for Travellers in Central & Northern Japan; being a guide to Tōkiō, Kiōto, Ōzaka, Hakodate, Nagasaki, and other cities. Murray's hand-book, Japan (2nd ed.). London: J. Murray – via HathiTrust.
- Basil Hall Chamberlain; W.B. Mason (1901), A Handbook for Travellers in Japan (6th ed.), London: J. Murray, OCLC 2463325, OL 6991294M
- Basil Hall Chamberlain; W.B. Mason (1903), A Handbook for Travellers in Japan (7th ed.), London: J. Murray, OL 25302448M
- Basil Hall Chamberlain; W.B. Mason (1907), A Handbook for Travellers in Japan including the whole empire from Saghalien to Formosa (8th ed.), London: J. Murray, OCLC 1329108, OL 6991983M
- Handbook for Travellers in Japan (9th ed.), London: J. Murray, 1913 – via HathiTrust + index

=== Portugal ===
- Handbook for Travellers in Portugal (2nd ed.), London: J. Murray, 1856
- Handbook for Travellers in Portugal (3rd ed.), London: J. Murray, 1875
- Handbook for Travellers in Portugal, Murray's hand-book Portugal, Madeira, Azores, and Canaries (4th ed.), London: J. Murray, 1887 + Index

=== Russia ===
- Hand-book for Northern Europe, London: John Murray, 1849. v.2: Finland and Russia
- Hand-book for Travellers in Russia, Poland, and Finland (2nd ed.), London: J. Murray, 1868, OL 23414674M
- Hand-book for Travellers in Russia, Poland, and Finland (4th ed.), London: J. Murray, 1888 + Index

=== Scandinavia ===
- Hand-book for Northern Europe, London: John Murray, 1849
- Hand-book for Travellers in Denmark, Norway, and Sweden (3rd ed.), London: J. Murray, 1871
- Hand-book for Travellers in Sweden, London: J. Murray, 1877
- Hand-book for Travellers in Norway (7th ed.), London: J. Murray, 1880 + Index
  - 1892 ed.
- Handbook for Travellers in Denmark, with Sleswig and Holstein, and Iceland (5th ed.), London: J. Murray, 1883

=== Spain ===
- Richard Ford (1845), A Handbook for Travellers in Spain, London: J. Murray
- Richard Ford (1855), A Handbook for Travellers in Spain (3rd ed.), London: J. Murray, OCLC 2145740 + Index
  - Pt.1 (Andalucia, Ronda and Granada, Murcia, Valencia, and Catalonia)
  - Pt. 2 (Estremadura, Leon, Gallicia, the Asturias, the Castiles (Old and New), the Basque Provinces, Arragon, and Navarre)
- Richard Ford (1882), A Handbook for Travellers in Spain (6th ed.), London: J. Murray. Pt. 2 + Index
- Richard Ford (1890), Handbook for Travellers in Spain (7th ed.), London: J. Murray + Index
  - v.1 (through p.298)
  - v.2
- Richard Ford (1892), Handbook for Travellers in Spain (8th ed.), London: J. Murray – via HathiTrust + Index

=== Switzerland ===
- Handbook for Travellers in Switzerland (12th ed.), London: J. Murray, 1867
  - Handbook for Travellers in Switzerland, London: J. Murray, 1886
  - Handbook for Switzerland (19th ed.), London: Edward Stanford, 1904

=== Syria ===
- Handbook for Travellers in Syria and Palestine, London: J. Murray, 1858, OCLC 2300777. Pt. 1; Pt. 2 (p. 291-652); index
- Handbook for Travellers in Syria and Palestine, London: J. Murray, 1868. + Index

=== Turkey ===
- A Hand-book for Travellers in the Ionian Islands, Greece, Turkey, Asia Minor, and Constantinople, London: J. Murray, 1840, OCLC 397597, OL 6952607M
- A Hand-book for Travellers in the Ionian Islands, Greece, Turkey, Asia Minor, and Constantinople, London: J. Murray, 1845, OCLC 397597, OL 6952607M + Index
- A Handbook for Travellers in Turkey (3rd ed.), London: J. Murray, 1854, OCLC 2145740, OL 6952606M. (Index).
- R. Lambert Playfair (1882), Handbook to the Mediterranean (2nd revised ed.), London: John Murray Pt. 1
- R. Lambert Playfair (1892), Handbook to the Mediterranean (3rd revised ed.), London: John Murray, OCLC 6853896 Pt.1; Pt. 2
- Charles Wilson, ed. (1895), Handbook for Travellers in Asia Minor, Transcaucasia, Persia, etc, London: J. Murray, OCLC 8979039, OL 6953016M. (Index).
  - 1895 ed. in Google books
- Handbook for Travellers in Constantinople, Brûsa, and the Troad, London: J. Murray, 1907
