= Benjamin Booth =

English art collector

Benjamin Booth (1732–1806) was an English director of the East India Company and art collector.

He was the fourth son of John Booth of London and his wife Anne Lloyd of Liverpool. He was elected a Fellow of the Royal Society, in 1772.

== Family and art collection ==
Booth married Jane Salwey, daughter of Richard Salwey of Moor Park, Shropshire and an heiress, in 1760. They had a son Richard Salwey Booth, who matriculated at Christ Church, Oxford in 1781 and became a clergyman, and three daughters. The son was an amateur artist, painting watercolours in Wales and Scotland, and an acquaintance of Paul Sandby who showed at the Royal Academy. He is identified by William Prideaux Courtney as a companion in 1797 of Lord Webb John Seymour and Christopher Smyth; and as in the Algernon Graves Royal Academy records from 1796 to 1807.

Their daughter Marianne Booth (1767–1849), known as an artist, married Richard Ford the barrister, and was mother of Richard Ford the writer. Another daughter, Elizabeth Mary, was a pupil of John Opie, who asked to marry her in 1797, and was refused. The third daughter was Jane.

The large collection of works by Richard Wilson put together by Booth was still in the Ford family in the 20th century. Etchings of some of the works were published in an 1825 book by Thomas Hastings.
