= Gabriel Dias =

Gabriel Dias may refer to:

- Gabriel (futsal) (born 1980), Gabriel da Silva Dias, Brazilian futsal flank
- Gabriel Dias (racing driver) (born 1990), Brazilian racing driver
- Gabriel Dias (footballer) (born 1994), Brazilian football defensive midfielder

== See also ==
- Gabriela Dias Moreschi (born 1994), Brazilian handballer
- Gabriela Mantellato Dias (born 1991), Brazilian water polo player
- Gabriel Díaz (disambiguation)
