= Marinid campaign in Andalusia (1277) =

- Part of the Reconquista
Date	August – November 1277
Location	Andalusia (present-day Spain)
Result	Muslim victory

Belligerents
Kingdom of Castile	Marinid Sultanate; Emirate of Granada

Commanders and leaders
Alfonso X of Castile; Alfonso Fernandez	Abu Yusuf Yaqub ibn Abd Al-Haqq; Muhammad II of Granada

Strength
Unknown	Unknown

Casualties and losses
Unknown	Unknown

The Marinid campaign in Andalusia was launched by the Marinid Sultan, Abu Yusuf Yaqub ibn Abd al-Haqq, with his Granadan allies against the Kingdom of Castile in Andalusia. The Muslims ravaged and sacked the countrysides of Seville, Jerez, and Cordoba, defeating any resistance encountered and capturing several fortresses.

== Background ==
The truce that was signed by the Marinid Sultan, Abu Yusuf Yaqub ibn Abd al-Haqq, and Infante Sancho, in early 1276 was short-lived. After finding out that a civil war broke out in Castile, the Marinid Sultan decided to take advantage of the situation and occupy the south of the Iberian Peninsula, thus breaking the truce. The Sultan landed in Tarifa on June 28, 1277, and moved to Ronda, where he was joined by the Granadans of Guadix and Málaga.

== Campaign ==
=== First campaign ===
The Sultan left Ronda on August 2 with the intention of going to Seville. The Muslims did not encounter any resistance and began ravaging and enslaving the countryside, capturing and destroying villages and towns, and burning agricultural fields. The next day, in the Mawlid, the Muslims encountered the Castilian garrison of Seville, who were positioned on the banks of the Guadalquivir. They were led by Alfosno Fernandez; however, the Castilians were in no match for the large Muslim forces; they were routed and retreated to Seville. On August 29, the Muslims returned with large loot and prisoners to Algeciras.

=== Second Campaign ===
On 15 September, the Muslims returned again, this time to Jerez de la Frontera. Similarly, he attacked and ravaged the countryside. The Muslims assaulted several towns, including Sanlúcar de Barrameda and Guillena. Taking a large number of booty and prisoners, the Muslims once again returned to Algeciras.

=== Third Campaign ===
On October 30, the Muslims launched their third attack, this time towards Córdoba. The Muslims assaulted Benamejí fortress and destroyed it. The Sultan sent raiding parties, ravaging and enslaving, capturing many prisoners and cattle. The Muslims went to Córdoba and stayed there for 3 days, assaulting nearby fortresses. After this, the Castilians dispatched a delegation of monks and priests, perhaps representatives of military orders. They asked the Sultan for a truce, but the Sultan told them to make peace first with the Granadan Sultan, Muhammad II, who was with him. The Granadan Sultan accepted, and thus a peace treaty was made. The Muslims returned to Granada, where the Marinid Sultan relinquished all the loot to the Granadans.

== Sources ==
- H. Salvador Martínez (2010), Alfonso X, the Learned, A Biography.
- Ahmad ibn Khalid an-Nasiri (1894), Al-Istiqsa li-Akhbar duwal al-Maghrib al-Aqsa, Vol III.
