= Alamillo Park =

Park in Seville, Spain

Coordinates: 37.4173°N 5.9972°W

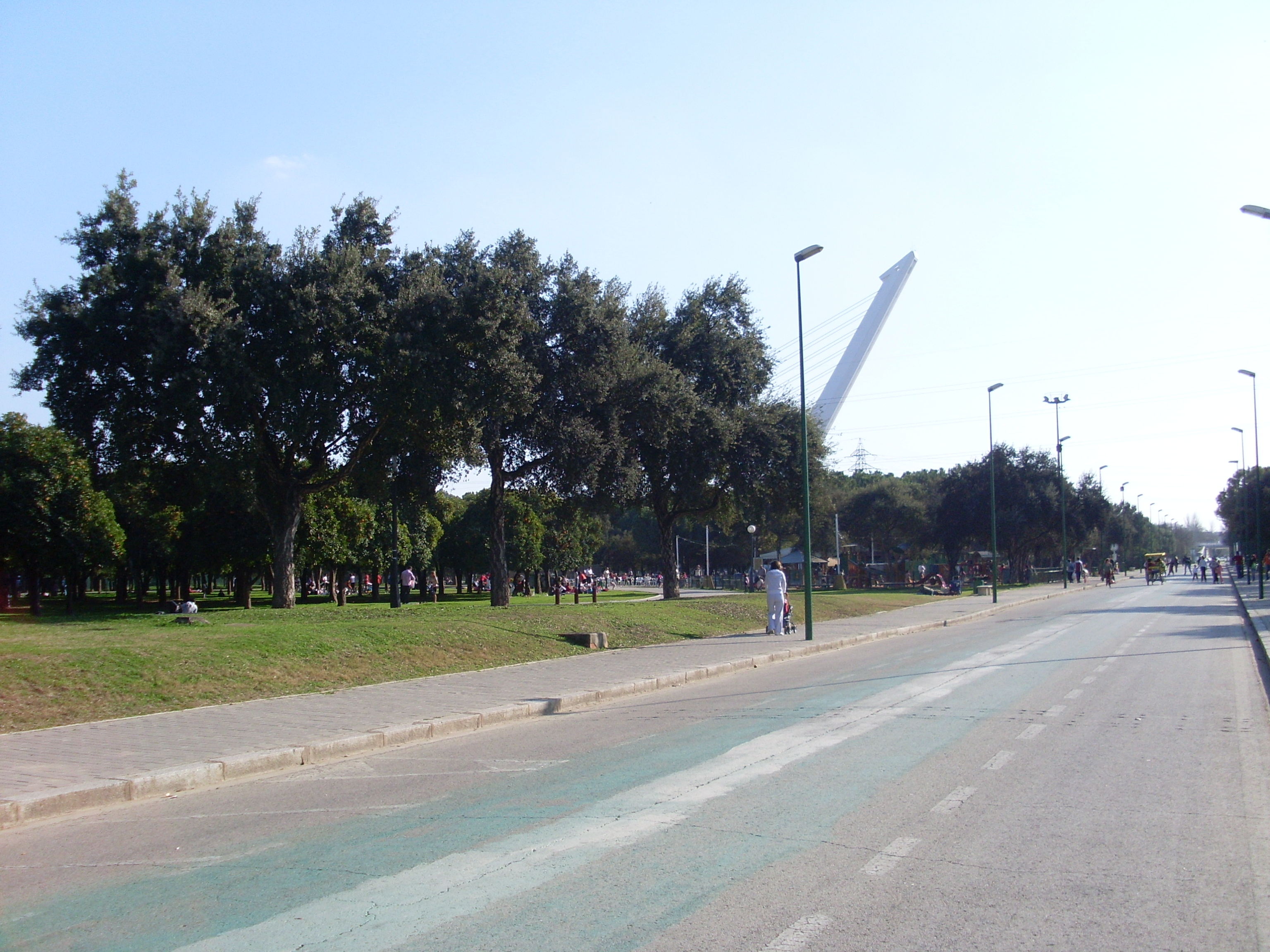
- Interactive map of Alamillo Park
- Location: Sevilla, Santiponce Spain
- Nearest city: Seville
- Open: 12 October 1993

Alamillo Park (Spanish: Parque del Alamillo) is a metropolitan park located between the town of Santiponce (Sevilla) and Seville, Spain. The park is one of Spain's largest urban parks at, 120 hectares. It is called the "green lung" of Sevilla.

== History ==
In 1993 the park opened to public. At the nursery Expo of 1992, the park became a wildlife reserve spanning an area of about 10 hectares. Consequently, a botanical collection of more than 100 different species, and a greenhouse were added.

Previously known as Alamillo, Alamillo Park was the focus of regional government. They obtained the park in celebration of the Universal Exposition of Seville. The park covers 85 acres of the northernmost area of Cartuja Island, an area between the old and new channels of the Guadalquivir river.

After completion, Alamillo Park will feature Mediterranean trees such as elm, pine, poplar and the endemic cork oak. It is known for the bitter orange fragrance that fills the spring air.

In 2018 it was certified by the Andalusian Committee of Ecological Agriculture (CAAE) of Green Zones and Ecological Gardening, with a degree of excellence.

== Environment ==
The park is developed around two lakes, Lake Mayor and Lake Menor and is fully equipped with recreational, leisure and sporting facilities. The names describe the vegetation as well as its culinary uses.

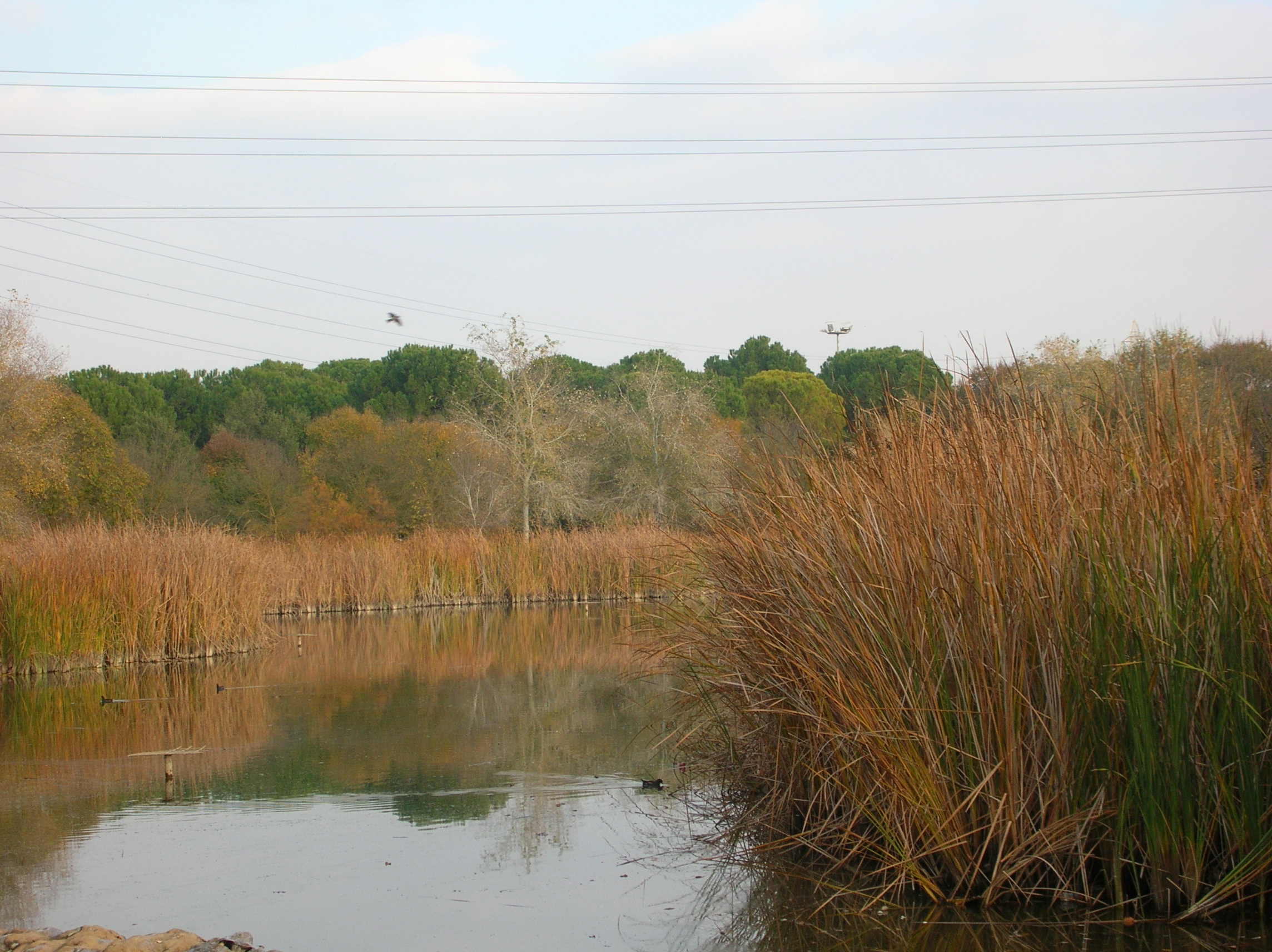
Lake in the park

== Activities ==
An ecological tour of the park includes the mammals, amphibians, reptiles and waterfowl that inhabit the park.

A program of cultural activities called "Summertimes Alamillo" organised by the Junta de Andalucia occupies the months of July and August. People of all ages can participate in performances, rides, theater and other activities, .

On Sunday mornings, activities including swings, biking and train rides are available.

Designed by Friends of the Railroad, visitors can enjoy the facility of Railway Alamillo, a miniature railway track traversing 127m where both children and adults can enjoy steam and electric locomotives (that actually work with coal).

Every October 12, the Big Birthday Bash is celebrated in Alamillo Park. The event includes activities such as cake tasting, performances and train tours.

A program of guided visits to this nursery is available.

The garden hosts one of the largest areas dedicated to urban gardening in the city.

== Infrastructure ==
Security and the maintenance cost is supported by the Junta de Andalucía.
