= Gabriel Díaz Berbel =

Spanish politician (1940–2011)

José Gabriel Díaz Berbel (19 March 1940 – 17 June 2011) was a Spanish politician of the People's Alliance (AP) and People's Party (PP). He was a councillor (1987–1999) and mayor (1995–1999) in his hometown of Granada, and a deputy (1986–1995) and senator (1982–1986; 1996–2004) in the Cortes Generales.

== Biography ==
Díaz Berbel joined the People's Alliance (AP) in 1981 as the party's president in the province of Granada, holding that role for six years and a place in the party's national executive until the resignation of founder Manuel Fraga in 1986. In 1982, he was elected in the first elections to the Parliament of Andalusia, as well as to the Senate of Spain representing the Granada constituency.

First elected to the city council as his party's lead candidate in 1987, Díaz Berbel became mayor in 1995, the first mayor from outside the Spanish Socialist Workers' Party (PSOE). In the 1999 elections, his party was the most voted for, but lost power due to a pact between the PSOE, United Left (IU) and Andalusian Party (PA). In 2004, the 25th anniversary of democratic local elections, he and all other mayors were given Granada's Gold Medal of Merit. In January 2011, he left his party in solidarity with Francisco Álvarez-Cascos, who had resigned from the People's Party of Asturias.

During his time in office, Díaz Berbel accompanied Dorothy Howell Rodham – mother of First Lady of the United States Hillary Clinton – when she was studying incognito in Granada. Through his recommendation to her, Bill Clinton and his wife visited Granada's Alhambra palace on their 1997 visit to Spain. The Clintons' visit to the site boosted numbers of foreign tourists, particularly Americans.

Known as "Kiki", Díaz Berbel lived in the Albaicín neighbourhood of the city. He was found dead of a heart attack by his wife Fátima, at the age of 71. He was the first democratic mayor of Granada to die; incumbent José Torres Hurtado decreed two days of official mourning. His family declined an offer for him to be interned in the city's pantheon, believing that he would have wanted to be buried in the family plot.
