= List of municipalities in Andalusia =

The following list is of important municipalities (those with largest populations) in Andalusia, an autonomous community of Spain:

== Provincial lists ==
The following links are to province-specific lists which are more detailed, where all municipalities in a given province are ranked alphabetically.

- List of municipalities in Almería province
- List of municipalities in Cádiz province
- List of municipalities in Córdoba province
- List of municipalities in Granada province
- List of municipalities in Huelva province
- List of municipalities in Jaén province
- List of municipalities in Málaga province
- List of municipalities in Sevilla province

== Largest municipalities by population ==
The largest municipalities are listed below, ranked by population in 2019 (over 40,000 inhabitants).

Rank	Name of municipality	Province	Population (2001)	Population (2011)	Population (2019)
1	Sevilla	Sevilla	684,633	698,042	688,592
2	Málaga	Málaga	524,414	561,435	574,654
3	Córdoba	Córdoba	308,072	328,326	325,701
4	Granada	Granada	240,661	241,003	232,462
5	Jerez	Cádiz	183,273	211,784	212,749
6	Almería	Almería	166,328	189,680	198,533
7	Huelva	Huelva	142,284	147,808	143,663
8	Marbella	Málaga	100,036	135,124	143,386
9	Dos Hermanas	Seville	101,988	128,433	133,968
10	Algeciras	Cádiz	101,468	117,695	121,957
11	Cádiz	Cádiz	133,363	124,014	116,027
12	Jaén	Jaén	112,590	116,469	112,999
13	Roquetas de Mar	Almería	50,096	86,799	96,800
14	San Fernando	Cádiz	88,073	96,786	94,979
15	El Puerto	Cádiz	76,236	89,012	88,405
16	Chiclana	Cádiz	61,028	80,769	84,489
17	El Ejido	Almería	57,877	80,839	83,594
18	Mijas	Málaga	46,232	74,028	82,742
19	Vélez-Málaga	Málaga	57,142	76,922	81,643
20	Fuengirola	Málaga	49,675	72,019	80,309
21	Alcalá	Seville	57,426	73,317	75,279
22	Sanlúcar	Cádiz	60,254	67,232	68,684
23	Torremolinos	Málaga	44,772	66,270	68,661
24	Estepona	Málaga	43,109	64,468	68,286
25	Benalmádena	Málaga	34,565	61,394	68,128
26	La Línea	Cádiz	59,437	65,412	63,147
27	Motril	Granada	51,298	60,460	58,020
28	Linares	Jaén	57,578	60,799	57,414
29	Lucena	Córdoba	37,028	42,355	52,605
30	Utrera	Seville	45,175	51,722	50,728
31	Rincon de la Victoria	Málaga	25,302	41,040	47,179
32	Mairena del Aljarafe	Seville	35,833	42,570	46,089
33	Puerto Real	Cádiz	35,783	41,299	41,627
34	Antequera	Málaga	40,289	41,741	41,239
35	Alhaurín de la Torre	Málaga	23,369	37,020	40,345
