= A Handbook for Travellers in Spain =

1845 book by Richard Ford

- Title page for A Handbook for Travellers in Spain (8th edition)
- Author: Richard Ford
- Subject: Travel literature
- Publisher: John Murray
- Publication date: 1845
- Media type: Print
- Dewey Decimal: 914.6
- LC Class: DP14

A Handbook for Travellers in Spain is an 1845 work of travel literature by English writer Richard Ford. It has been described as a defining moment in the genre.

British tourists were travelling through Europe in increasing numbers and the need for guidebooks was beginning to be supplied by publishers like John Murray. In 1845 Ford, who had gained tremendous knowledge of Spain by extensive travel on horseback, wrote this account enlivened by humour and anecdotes.

In Ford's obituary, commonly attributed to Sir William Stirling-Maxwell, "so great a literary achievement had never before been performed under so humble a title." Ford marked, with George Borrow the eccentric English traveller, an interest in Spain that would continue through the twentieth century on the part of British writers: Gerald Brenan, Norman Lewis and George Orwell were among the most eminent of these successors, with Jason Webster (the author of Duende, Andalus and Guerra) and Chris Stewart (the author of Driving Over Lemons) being contemporary.

The original edition was published by John Murray in 1845 in two volumes. The following year in 1846 he prepared a more manageable version entitled Gatherings from Spain which included some extra material. Second and third editions of the original book appeared in 1847 and 1855 respectively. As of 1966, the book was still being reprinted.

In 1855 Richard Ford also wrote Andalucia, Ronda and Granada, Murcia, Valencia, and Catalonia; the portions best suited for the invalid.

== See also ==
- Murray's Handbooks for Travellers (series)
