= Richard Ford (English writer) =

English writer

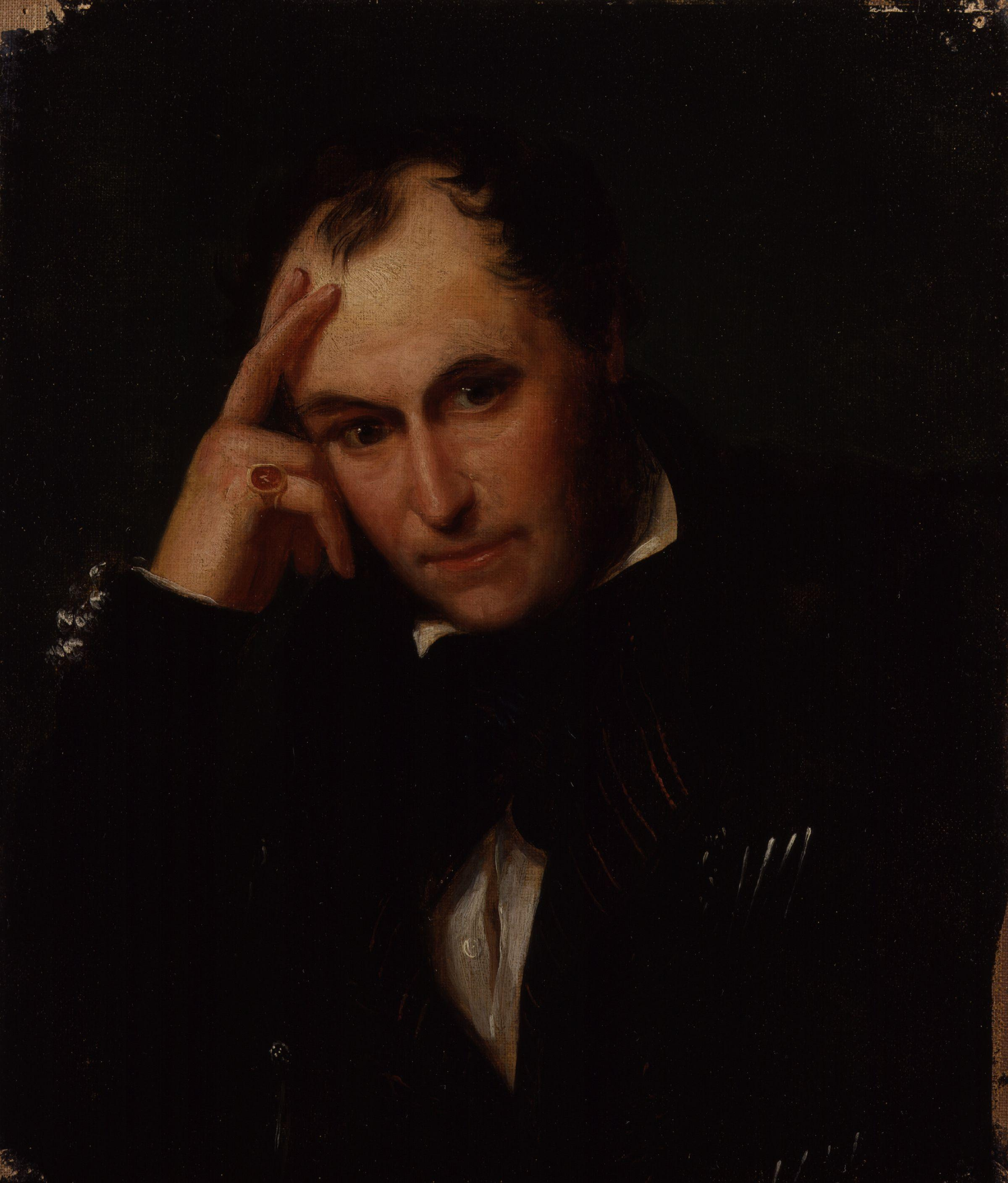
- Richard Ford by Antonio Chatelain
- Born: 1796
- Died: August 31, 1858 (aged 61–62); Heavitree
- Writing career
- Subject: Travels in Spain

Richard Ford (1796–1858) was an English travel writer known for his books on Spain. Born in Chelsea into an upper-class family and educated at Oxford, he first moved to Spain in 1830, where he travelled extensively and collected notes and drawings. Upon return to England, he wrote an account of his journeys in A Handbook for Travellers in Spain, first published in 1845, described as one of masterpieces of the travel literature genre. An erudite art collector, he befriended many important art and literature figures of his time. Ford was himself skilled in drawing himself, and made illustrations for his own and his friends' books.

== Biography ==
Ford was born at 129 Sloane Street, Chelsea on 21 April 1796, the elder son of Richard Ford (1758–1806), MP 1789–1791, Chief Magistrate at Bow Street and knighted 1801 and his wife Marianne (1767–1849), daughter of Benjamin Booth, East India Company Director and collector of the landscape paintings of Richard Wilson (1713/4–1782).

Ford was educated at Winchester College, and matriculated at Trinity College, Oxford in 1813, graduating B.A. 1817 and M.A. in 1822. A lifelong Tory, in spite of joining the Whig Brooks's Club, he was a great admirer of the Duke of Wellington. He travelled on the Continent at the close of the Napoleonic Wars visiting France, Germany, Austria and Italy between 1815 and the late 1820s, latterly with his first wife, Harriet Capel, whom he married in 1824. She was an illegitimate daughter of the George Capel-Coningsby, 5th Earl of Essex, who had been a close friend of his father. Ford entered Lincoln's Inn in 1819 and was called to the Bar in 1822, but never practised. His real interest lay in the fine arts where he collected old master prints, particularly those of Parmigianino and Andrea Meldolla (Schiavone). In 1822 and 1824 he and his wife Harriet issued their own etchings after these two masters. Between 1825 and 1832 the Fords has six children, the three youngest dying in infancy. By 1830 Mrs. Ford's health was causing concern and it was decided to visit the warmer climate of Spain. Their stay lasted from October 1830 to October 1833, Seville being their base, except for the summers of 1831 and 1833, which they spent in the Alhambra at Granada where the climate was cooler. There he wrote about the rivalry between Marie Guy-Stéphan and Maria Brambilla, specialist in Donizetti and first dancer of La Scala.

In Seville he bought Spanish paintings and drawings mainly from the British Vice-Consul, Julian Benjamin Williams, who was also a dealer. These, among others, included works by Murillo, Zurbarán and Alonso Cano. Later he bought a Ribalta at Valencia. He was to send paintings to auction at Rainy's Rooms in Regent Street in 1836. Some of these were bought in. In all probability Williams was instrumental in introducing Ford to local artists José Gutiérrez de la Vega (1791–1865) and José Domínguez Bécquer (1805–1841), both of whom Ford patronised. In his correspondence he also mentions José Maria Escacena (1800–1858), later a painter of Moroccan scenes and Antonio Maria Esquivel (1806–57). From late 1832 Ford was also to house and patronise the British artist, John Frederick Lewis (1804/5–1876). When back in England, he befriended the Scottish artist, David Roberts, who was in Spain 1832–1833, but apparently Ford never met him while they were both there.

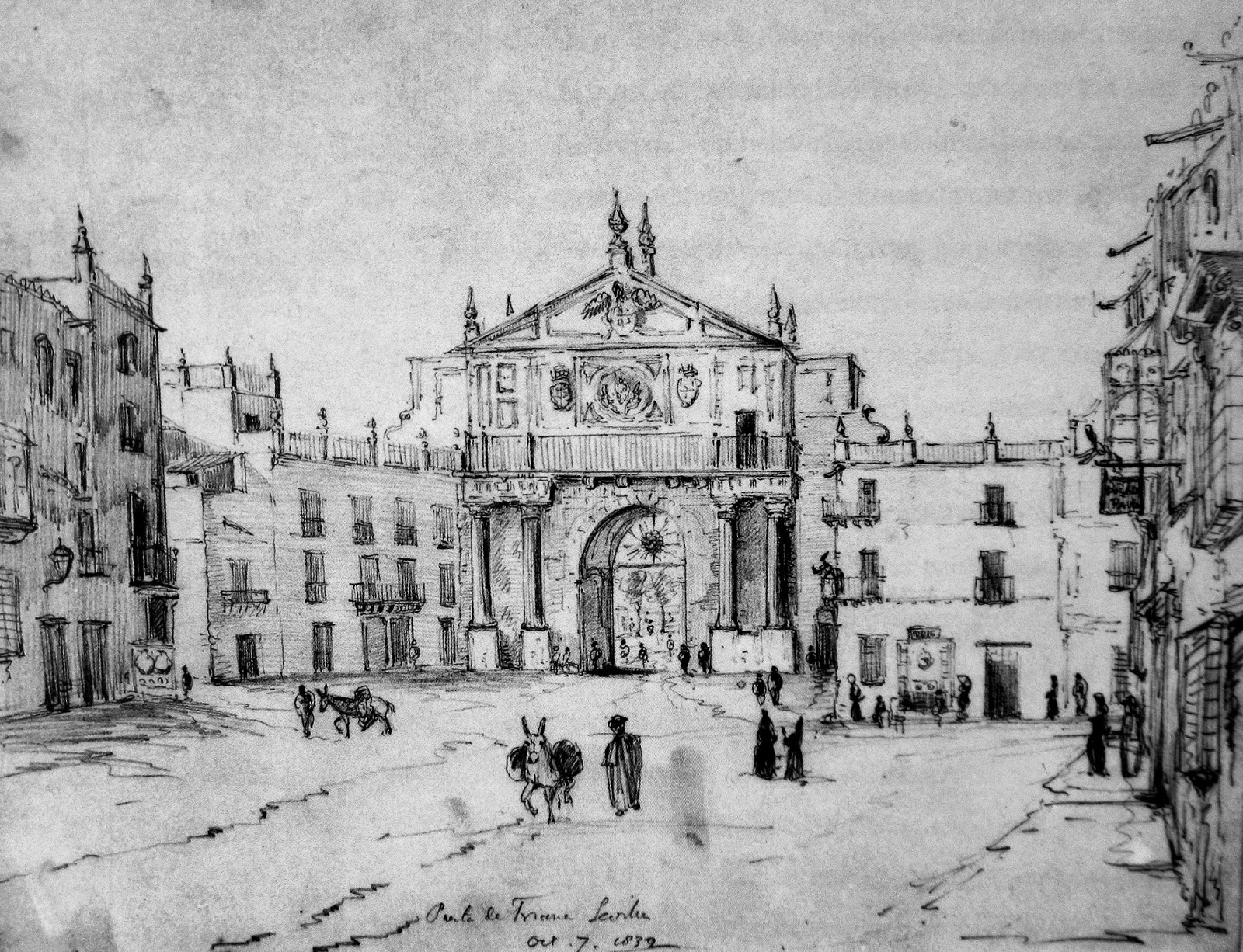
Ford's drawing of Puerta de Triana, a gate of Seville's Old Town

Ford and his wife made many topographical drawings of Seville and its vicinity and during their wider travels in Spain. These constitute an important record of the Spain of the period as many of the buildings he drew were later to disappear. Ford also kept detailed notebooks of what he observed. His journeys took him through Andalucia, Extremadura, Northwest Spain and several times to Madrid. Late in 1831, together with Harriet Ford, he travelled along the Mediterranean coast to Barcelona and via Eastern Spain to Madrid. Apart from that a large part of the north and southeast of the country remained unvisited. During his stay he bought many Spanish books, particularly of literature, artistic treatises, topography, local histories and of local saints. He continued to procure such items after his return home, notably at the Heber (1834–1836), W. B. Chorley (1846) and Riego (1847) sales, which helped to augment his knowledge of those areas he did not visit. He also relied on friends such as Henry Unwin Addington, the British minister in Madrid 1829–1833 and Pascual de Gayangos, an Arabist, to provide him with more recent publications.

Ford's wife Harriet was constantly in poor health and after their return to England in 1833 the couple lived separately. Ford went to live in Exeter and in 1835 he bought a Heavitree house close to its eastern boundary. There, he created a Spanish style garden and built a Moorish-style summer house. This interest caused him to write an article on cob walls, contributed to John Murray's Quarterly Review (April 1837), in which he likened the local Devon cob to the Spanish tapia buildings. This proved to be the precursor of many contributions, mainly, but not exclusively, to the Quarterly, mainly on Spanish subjects, which continued until 1857. As a result, in late 1840 Murray submitted the manuscript of George Borrow's account of the Gypsies of Spain, The Zincali, to Ford, who recommended publication. This resulted in a literary friendship in which Ford did his very best to encourage the highly temperamental author and which came to an end in 1851, when Ford, because of his own personal commitments, but also puzzlement about its content, felt unable to review Lavengro; Borrow took offence. A review of Captain Charles Rochfort Scott's excursions in the mountains of Ronda and Granada (Quarterly, April 1839) demonstrated Ford's topographical knowledge of the area, and this may have prompted Murray to invite Ford to write a handbook for Spain.

The first Mrs. Ford died in May 1837 and Ford married the Hon. Eliza Cranstoun (1808–1849) in 1838. Their daughter was born in 1840. He and his wife visited Italy in 1839–1840. Ford began the work on his most famous work, Handbook for Travellers in Spain on their return. A first draft took until the end of 1843 to complete and was partially printed in 1844, but was finally abandoned in early 1845, because of its hostility to perceived inadequacies of Spanish government, the cult of Mariolatry (worship of the Virgin Mary), and Spanish military incompetence together with French misconduct and depredations during the Peninsular War in which Marshal Soult, who happened to be the French Head of Government at the time, was categorised as the 'plundermaster general'. A revised edition, still highly critical, if somewhat toned down, appeared in two volumes in July 1845. It remained a highly opinionated, strongly Protestant view of Spain, but nevertheless provided very detailed knowledge of the country and offered specialist information about the fine arts, including, most notably, a detailed consideration of the collections of the Prado. It is relished for its erudition, prejudice and dry wit. It remains one of the very few guide books to be regarded as a classic of travel literature in its own right. Of the 2,000 copies of this first published edition 1,800 were sold by the end of the year.

Murray wanted a single-volume handbook, so Ford discarded much of the preliminary content and incorporated it with fresh material as Gatherings from Spain, issued in Murray's Home and Colonial Library at the end of 1846. The one-volume Handbook appeared in 1847. He was also helping his friends Sir Edmund Head and William Stirling (later Sir William Stirling Maxwell) write their surveys of Spanish art, both of which were published in 1848. The second Mrs. Ford died of tuberculosis in January 1849 and in 1851 Ford married Mary Molesworth (1816–1910) of Pencarrow, Cornwall.

In 1843 Ford had published a life of Velázquez in the Penny Cyclopaedia and in 1851 on a tour of the north of England and Scotland with Mrs Ford 'rediscovered' the Rokeby Venus in North Yorkshire then in the possession of William J. S. Morritt (1813–1874), (now in the National Gallery). It had been known previously to very few people and had its first public display at the 1857 Manchester Art Treasures Exhibition. In 1855 Ford published the third edition of the Handbook, restored to two volumes and containing much new material, but by this time his health was failing. In 1855 he also wrote "Andalucia, Ronda and Granada, Murcia, Valencia, and Catalonia; the portions best suited for the invalid".

He died of Bright's disease at Heavitree on 31 August 1858. His fine collection of pictures was inherited by his widow Mary.

== Family ==
In 1824 Richard Ford married Harriet Capel, who died in 1837. They had six children, and of those he was survived only by two daughters and a son, Sir Francis Clare Ford. In 1837 Richard became engaged to Eliza Cranstoun, sister of the 10th Lord Cranstoun; the marriage took place on 28 February 1838. The only child of Richard and Eliza was Margaret 'Meta' Ford, who was born in October 1840, married Oswald John Frederick Crawfurd, and died in 1899. Eliza Ford died on 23 January 1849. In the summer of 1851, Richard Ford married his third wife, Mary Ford, née Molesworth, (1816–1910), who was a daughter of Sir Arscott Ourry Molesworth, 7th Baronet (1789–1823).

Ford's niece was the archer, Cecilia Betham.

== Encounter with Beethoven ==
Ford made an educational trip to Germany and Austria after leaving Trinity College in the summer of 1817, arriving in Vienna on 12 October 1817. The highlight of his stay in the city was a meeting with Ludwig van Beethoven, whom he visited on 28 November 1817. Beethoven received Ford extremely kindly, gave him an engraved portrait of himself, and composed a short Allegretto for string quartet in B minor (WoO 210) especially for Ford in his presence during his visit. The piece remained completely unknown the autograph came up for auction on 8 December 1999 at Sotheby's in London. It is now in the Bodmer Library in Cologny, Switzerland.

== Works ==
- Richard Ford, An Historical Enquiry into the Unchangeable Character of a War in Spain, London, John Murray 1837
- A Handbook for Travellers in Spain. suppressed edition (1844–45). (Abandoned before publication, ends in mid-sentence at page 768. Copy in The British Library).
- A Handbook for Travellers in Spain, London, John Murray 1845, 2 vols., 2nd Ed., 1847, 3rd Ed., 1855, 2 vols. New Ed., ed Ian Robertson, Fontwell and London, Centaur Press 1966. 3 vols.
- Gatherings from Spain, London, John Murray 1846. Everyman Ed., intro Thomas Okey, (1906) and later reps., intro Brinsley Ford, 1970, intro. and ed.Ian Robertson, London, Pallas Athene 2000.

== Selected bibliography ==
- Robertson, Ian, Richard Ford, Hispanophile, Connoisseur and Critic, Wymondham, Michael Russell 2004. The only detailed biography, provides a full bibliography up to 2002.
- Alberich, José. Richard Ford ó el hispanista hispanofobo, El Cateto y el Milor y otros ensayos anglohispanoles, Sevilla, Universidad de Sevilla, 2001, 79–108.
- Barberán, F.J. Rodriguez, La Sevilla de Richard Ford 1830–1833. Exhibition Catalogue, Sevilla, Fundación El Monte 2007.
- Richard Ford. Viajes por Espaňa (1830–1833) Exhibition Catalogue, Madrid, Real Academia de Bellas Artes de San Fernando, 2014.
- Bean, Thomas, "Knapp and 'a Botcher'" George Borrow Bulletin, 2, 1991, 14–18.
- 'I saw the Diamond in the Mass of Rubbish', Richard Ford and his friendship with George Borrow, Proceedings of the George Borrow Conference 1991, ed. Gillian Fraser, Toronto 1992.
- "Richard Ford as Picture Collector and Patron in Spain", Burlington Magazine, CXXXVII, February 1995, 96–107.
- "Richard Ford and Gatherings from Spain". The Book Collector, 44, 1995, 67–71.
- "The Spanish Library of Richard Ford", The Book Collector, 59, 2010, 369–91.
- Brigstocke, Hugh (Ed) "The Correspondence between Edmund Head, Richard Ford and William Stirling", Walpole Society, LXXVII, 2015, 379–478.
- Constable, Thomas, "Archibald Constable and his Literary Correspondents". Edinburgh, Edmondston and Douglas, 3 vols, 1873, II, 127–142.
- Ford, Brinsley, "J.F. Lewis and Richard Ford in Seville", Burlington Magazine, LXXX, 1942, 124–29.
- "Richard Ford's Articles and Reviews", Book Handbook, I, 1948, 369–80.
- Richard Ford en Sevilla, Madrid, Instituto Diego Velázquez, 1963.
- Richard Ford in Spain, Exhibition catalogue, Wildenstein, London 1974.
- Richard Ford, The Ford Collection, Walpole Society, LX, 1998, 1, 23–56.
- Giménez Cruz, Antonio, ¡Cosas de los Ingleses! Madrid, Editorial Complutense 997.
- El Espaňa Pintoresca de David Roberts, Malaga, Universidad de Malaga, 2nd Ed. 2004.
- Glick, Thomas, "Richard Ford and Spanish Culture", The Texas Quarterly, 14, 1971, 67–79.
- Hitchcock, Richard (Ed) Richard Ford: Letters to Gayangos, Exeter, University of Exeter 1974.
- "Richard Ford in Sevilla", George Borrow Bulletin, 24, 2002, 69–81.
- Hoskins, W.G., "The Finest Travel Book in English", The Listener, LX, 1958, 337–39.
- Howarth, David, Mr. Morritt's Venus: Richard Ford, Sir William Stirling-Maxwell and the 'Cosas de Espaňa'. Apollo, CI, no 452 (New Series) October 1999, 37–44.
- Hughes, Thomas, "Richard Ford, In Memoriam", Fraser's Magazine, 58,1858, 422–24.
- Knapp, William Ireland, The Life, Writings and Correspondence of George Borrow, London, John Murray 1899, 2 vols.
- Medina Casado, Carmelo and Ruiz Mas, José (Eds) Las Cosas de Richard Ford, Jaen, Universidad de Jaen, 2010.
- Morton, H.V. A Stranger in Spain, London, Methuen 1955, 109–12.
- Prothero, R.E. (Ed) The Letters of Richard Ford, London, John Murray, 1905.
- Radford, Emily, 'Richard Ford and his Handbook for Travellers in Spain.' Transactions of the Devonshire Association, XC, 1958, 146 – 66.
- Robertson, Ian, Los Curiosos Impertinentes, Serbal, Madrid and Barcelona, 2nd Ed. 1988
- Shorter, Clement King, George Borrow and his Circle, London, Hodder and Stoughton 1913, 248–59.
- Principal Manuscript Sources of Letters in Public Collections.
  - British Library, London.
  - Hispanic Society of America, New York.
  - Massachusetts Historical Society, Boston.
  - Mitchell Library, Glasgow.
  - National Library of Scotland, Edinburgh.
  - Norfolk and Norwich Record Office, Norwich.

Most of Richard Ford's letters remain unpublished.
