= Siege of Jaén (1230) =

Battle of the Spanish Reconquista

- Part of the Reconquista
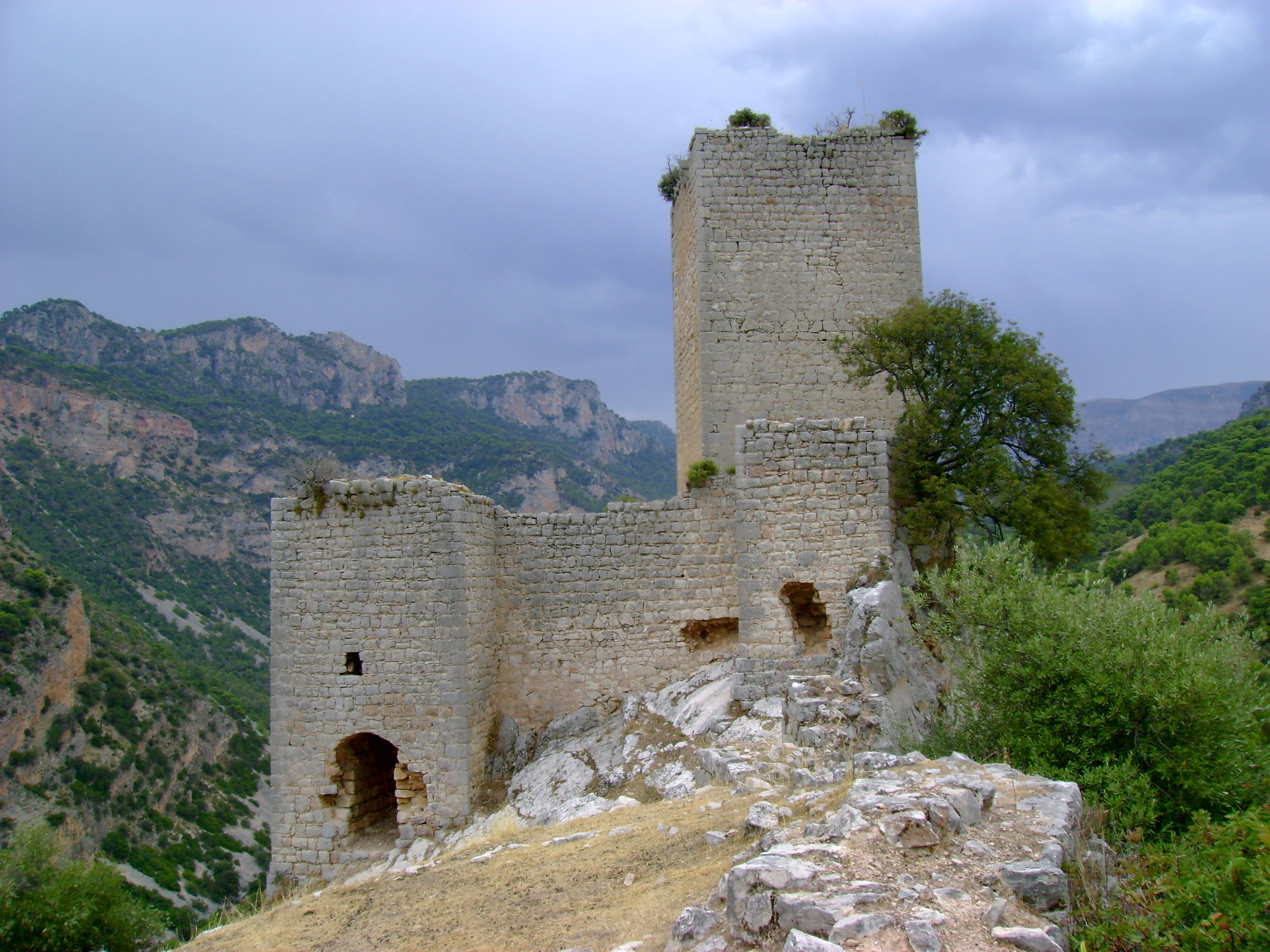
- The Castillo de Otíñar which was captured in 1229 by Ferdinand III's forces in preparation for the eventual siege of Jaén.
Date	24 June 1230–September, 1230
Location	Jaén, Province of Jaén, Spain
Result	Castilian abandonment of the siege

Belligerents
Kingdom of Castile	Dominions of Ibn Hud

Commanders and leaders
Ferdinand III of Castile	Unknown

Strength
Unknown	Unknown

Casualties and losses
Unknown	Unknown

Location of Jaén within Andalusia

The Siege of Jaén in the summer of 1230 was one of many sieges of the city during the long Spanish Reconquista. In the episode of 1230, King Ferdinand III of Castile unsuccessfully attempted to bring the fortress to submission by means of a direct assault over a three month period.

== Background ==
In 1225, Ferdinand and his Muslim ally, Abd Allah Ibn Muhammad al–Bayyasi of the Taifa of Baeza, conducted a sixteen-day siege of Jaén. In that military action, Ferdinand did not breach the city walls or capture the city, however, the Castilian forces raided the countryside destroying resources, conducting reconnaissance, and testing the city's defenses.

After the end of the siege, al-Bayyasi surrendered control of the fortresses of Andújar and Martos to the Castilians in fulfillment of an agreement with Ferdinand but continued to rule Baeza and expand his domain with the assistance of the Castilians. In 1226, however, al-Bayyasi was captured and killed by his Muslim opponents. Ferdinand then took control of the city of Baeza and the taifa cease to exist.

By 1228, Ferdinand had taken control of a number of fortified cities in the upper Guadalquivir River Valley and began to campaign in the territory around Jaén destroying agricultural resources and settlements reaching as far south as Otíñar. In 1229, Ferdinand continued his campaign to destroy resources around Jaén and also took possession of the cities of Sabiote, Garcíez and Jódar. By 1230, Ferdinand was ready again to attack and siege Jaén, the principal Muslim fortress protecting the passageway between the upper Castilian plateau and the cities of Córdoba and Seville.

The city of Jaén was built on the slopes of a prominent hill, the Cerro de Santa Catalina, and was enclosed by long curtain walls that descended from a fortified citadel, ran around the inhabited area, then climbed back toward the summit. The wall contained several towers, fortified gates, and defensive works. In addition, the city had internal springs which provided a secure water supply making it difficult for besiegers to force a surrender merely by damning external watercourses. Outside the walls, Jaén was surrounded by fertile irrigated gardens, orchards, grain fields, mulberry trees, and numerous rural settlements.

Although Jaén was ruled by Ibn Hūd al-Mutawakkil in 1230, he was not present when the siege began, and the identities of his Muslim governor and military commander during the 1230 siege are unknown.

== The siege ==
On 24 June 1230, Ferdinand commenced the formal siege of the Jaén fortress with a determination to capture the city that had withstood his previous assault five years earlier. Although the defenses of the city had been enhanced in the interim, Ferdinand and his army were better prepared and equipped with siege engines.

Ferdinand established multiple camps at various positions around the city and the siege machines were deployed. Included as a part of Ferdinand's army was a contingent composed of the Knights of Ávila. These warriors had also fought at the siege of Jaén in 1225 and according to the Crónica de la población de Ávila, Ferdinand was angry with them because of their tardy arrival at the conflict in 1225. As a result, Ferdinand assigned the Ávila contingent to an elevated forward position on the Cerro del Neveral facing Jaén's citadel. The Ávila were given at least one siege engine but were in such an isolated position that the main body of the Castilian army would not be able to readily assist them if the contingent were attacked.

Because of the threat of the forward position, the chronicle reports that the Muslims conducted repeated infantry and cavalry attacks against the Ávila encampment. In the account of the fighting at this location, the attacks became a daily occurrence. The Ávila contingent defended themselves and at time launched counterattacks of their own.

Meanwhile at other positions. Ferdinand's army maintained the siege and employed siege engines against Jaén's fortifications hurling large quantities of stones against the city's defenses. The Crónica latina de los reyes de Castilla reports that these operations inflicted considerable damage on Jaén. Despite the prolonged bombardment and other siege operations, the Castilians were unable to overcome the city's defenses.

Toward the end of September 1230, Ferdinand learned of the death of his father, Alfonso IX of León. The news of his father's death and the succession crisis that it created occurred at a time that coincided with a lack of substantial progress in the effort to capture Jaén despite nearly three months of sustained attack. As a result, Ferdinand lifted the siege of Jaén and departed to the north.

== Aftermath ==
After leaving Jaén, Ferdinand traveled to Orgaz to join his mother, Berengaria of Castile. The two then proceeded together to León where Ferdinand III, already King of Castile was to be crowned as the King of León and of Galicia.

Immediately after the end of the siege, the Jaén fortress remained under the control of Ibn Hūd. In 1233, the city would subsequently pass to Muhammad I, whose revolt against Ibn Hūd began at nearby Arjona in 1232 and ultimately led to the establishment of the Nasrid Emirate of Granada.

In 1245, Ferdinand conducted his third and final siege of Jaén. In 1246, the siege ended when Ferdinand and Muhammad I entered into a formal 20 year truce known as the Pact of Jaén. By means of the agreement, Muhammad I accepted personal vassalage to Ferdinand and surrendered the Jaén fortress to Ferdinand all in exchange for Ferdinand's recognition of Muhammad's rule over Granada.

== See also ==
- List of Castilian Battles

== Citations ==
=== References ===
- Abeledo, Manuel, ed. (2012). Crónica de la población de Ávila (in Spanish). Buenos Aires: SECRIT.
- Aguirre Sádaba, Francisco Javier; Jiménez Mata, María del Carmen (1979). Introducción al Jaén islámico: estudio geográfico–histórico (in Spanish). Jaén: Instituto de Estudios Giennenses. ISBN 84-00-04511-4.
- Arié, Rachel (1992). El reino naṣrí de Granada (1232–1492) (in Spanish). Madrid: Editorial MAPFRE. ISBN 84-7100-500-X.
- Barton, Simon (2005). "From Mercenary to Crusader: The Career of Álvar Pérez de Castro (d. 1239) Re–examined". In Harris, Julie; Martin, Therese (eds.). Church, State, Vellum, and Stone: Essays on Medieval Spain in Honor of John Williams. Leiden: Brill. ISBN 978-90-04-14537-5.
- Carmona Ruiz, María Antonia (2010). "La conquista de Baeza". Fuero de Baeza: Estudios introductorios (in Spanish). Jaén: Universidad de Jaén.
- Charlo Brea, Luis, ed. (1999). Crónica latina de los reyes de Castilla. Clásicos latinos medievales y renacentistas (in Spanish). Vol. 8. Translated by Charlo Brea, Luis. Madrid: Ediciones Akal. ISBN 978-84-460-0919-1.
- Eslava Galán, Juan (1987). "La campaña de 1225 y el primer cerco de Jaén por Fernando III". Boletín del Instituto de Estudios Giennenses (132). ISSN 0561-3590. OCLC 278941093.
- Eslava Galán, Juan (1988). "Las defensas almorávides de Jaén". Boletín del Instituto de Estudios Giennenses (in Spanish) (133). ISSN 0561-3590.
- Eslava Galán, Juan (1999). Los castillos de Jaén (in Spanish). Armilla, Granada: Ediciones Osuna. ISBN 84-89717-41-9.
- García Fitz, Francisco (1998). Castilla y León frente al Islam: Estrategias de expansión y tácticas militares (siglos XI–XIII) (in Spanish). Sevilla: Universidad de Sevilla. ISBN 84-472-0421-9.
- García Sanjuán, Alejandro (2000). "Consideraciones sobre el pacto de Jaén de 1246". In González Jiménez, Manuel (ed.). Sevilla 1248: Congreso internacional conmemorativo del 750 aniversario de la conquista de la ciudad de Sevilla por Fernando III, rey de Castilla y León (in Spanish). Madrid: Fundación Ramón Areces. pp. 715–722.
- González, Julio (1980). Reinado y diplomas de Fernando III (in Spanish). Vol. 1. Córdoba: Publicaciones del Monte de Piedad y Caja de Ahorros de Córdoba.
- González Jiménez, Manuel (2006). Fernando III el Santo: El rey que marcó el destino de España (in Spanish). Sevilla: Fundación José Manuel Lara. ISBN 978-84-96556-38-6.
- González Jiménez, Manuel (2014). "Fernando III y la repoblación de Andalucía". In Estepa Díez, Carlos; Carmona Ruiz, María Antonia (eds.). La Península Ibérica en tiempos de las Navas de Tolosa. Monografías de la Sociedad Española de Estudios Medievales (in Spanish). Vol. 5. Madrid: Sociedad Española de Estudios Medievales. ISBN 978-84-941363-8-2.
- Harvey, L. P. (1990). Islamic Spain, 1250 to 1500. Chicago: University of Chicago Press. ISBN 978-0-226-31962-9.
- Hernández Segura, Amparo, ed. (1966). Crónica de la población de Ávila. Textos Medievales (in Spanish). Valencia: Anubar.
- Jiménez de Rada, Rodrigo (1987). Fernández Valverde, Juan (ed.). Historia de rebus Hispaniae sive Historia Gothica. Corpus Christianorum, Continuatio Mediaevalis (in Latin). Vol. 72. Turnhout: Brepols. ISBN 978-2-503-03721-9.
- Kennedy, Hugh (1996). Muslim Spain and Portugal: A Political History of al-Andalus. London: Longman. ISBN 978-0-582-49515-9.
