= Siege of Jaén (1225) =

Failed siege of Jaén by Ferdinand III during the Reconquista

- Part of the Reconquista
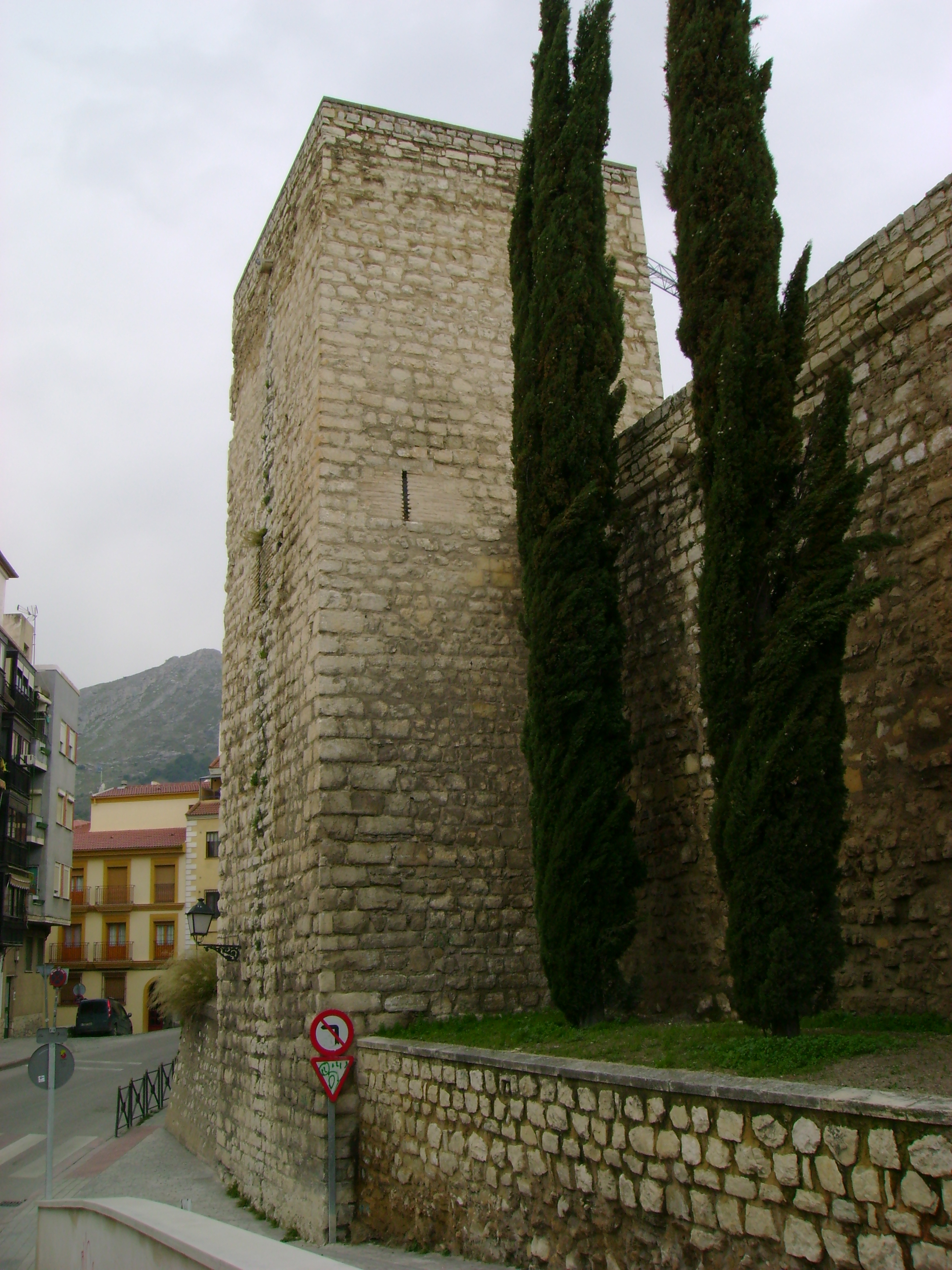
- The tower, Torreón del Conde de Torralba. One of the many on the walls of Jaén.
Date	Summer 1225
Location	Jaén, Province of Jaén, Spain 37°46′11″N 3°47′20″W
Result	Victory for the Muslim garrison of Jaén

Belligerents
Kingdom of Castile; Taifa of Baeza	Muslim opponents of the Taifa of Baeza

Commanders and leaders
Ferdinand III of Castile; Al–Bayyasi	Unknown

Strength
Unknown	Full complement uncertain 160 Christian knights

Casualties and losses
Unknown	Unknown
- Location within Andalusia Siege of Jaén (1225) (Spain)

The Siege of Jaén in the summer of 1225 was one of many sieges of the city during the long Spanish Reconquista. In the episode of 1225, Ferdinand III of Castile and his Muslim ally, Abd Allah Ibn Muhammad al–Bayyasi of the Taifa of Baeza unsuccessfully besieged the fortified city of Jaén which was under the command of rival Almohad claimants supported by the Christian knight, Álvaro Pérez de Castro and his personal military retinue of 160 mounted knights.

== Background ==
After the Christian victory at the Battle of Las Navas de Tolosa in 1212, the Almohads were strong enough to hold and defend their fortress cities in the Guadalquivir River Valley, but no longer dominated Andalusia. The Christian coalition associated with the Battle of Las Navas de Tolosa dissolved with the Aragonese and Navarrese forces returning to their own kingdoms. Even though Castile was exhausted from the Las Navas campaign, Alfonso VIII was able to attack and capture several frontier castles north of Jaén including Vilches and Baños, but unable to capture major fortified cities such as Baeza, Jaén, or Úbeda.

In 1214, Castile entered a period of political instability when Alfonso died. In succession over a three year period, the crown passed to Alfonso's ten–year–old son, Henry I, to his daughter Berengaria, and finally to his sixteen–year–old grandson, Ferdinand III. During this time, and into the early years of Ferdinand's reign, the succession crisis kept Castile occupied with internal politics as opposed to sustained military offensives.

In 1224, however, the Almohad state began to fall apart when Caliph Yūsuf II al–Mustanṣir died without an heir. This caused a succession crisis within the Almohad Caliphate. Several rival claimants emerged and the governors of Andalusia began to choose sides. At that time, Abd Allah Ibn Muhammad al–Bayyasi, an Almohad prince, was governor of Jaén. In 1225, however, al–Bayyasi rebelled and was deposed by the new Almohad caliph, Abdallah al-Adil. Al–Bayyasi then went to Baeza and created the Taifa of Baeza. At Baeza, however, al–Bayyasi did not have a large enough military force to initiate a civil war. Given his position, al–Bayyasi then allied with Ferdinand III and accepted Castilian vassalage. With that alliance and the instability of the Almohad Caliphate in Andalusia, Ferdinand was ready to strike at the Muslim fortress cities in the Guadalquivir River Valley.

== The targeted fortress ==
After leaving Toledo with his army, Ferdinand met up with al–Bayyāsī near Las Navas de Tolosa in June 1225. At that time, al–Bayyāsī formally became Ferdinand's vassal and the campaign to Jaén began. Ferdinand's objective remains uncertain. Historians such as Julio González and Juan Eslava Galán believe that the objective was to conduct reconnaissance, devastate the surrounding countryside, and prepare for a future conquest. Other historians such as Manuel Ballesteros Gaibrois believe that the objective was to immediately take control of the city.

Regardless, the fortress at Jaén was likely selected for attack as it served as a key defensive position in the primary corridor between Toledo in the upper Castilian plateau and the Muslim cities of Córdoba and Seville in the fertile Guadalquivir basin. The city was built on the slopes of a prominent hill, the Cerro de Santa Catalina, and served as a major Almohad military base.

The residential city was enclosed by long curtain walls that descended from a fortified citadel, ran around the inhabited area, then climbed back toward the summit. The wall contained several towers, fortified gates, and defensive works. In addition, the city had internal springs which provided a secure water supply making it difficult for besiegers to force a surrender merely by damning external watercourses. Outside the walls, Jaén was surrounded by fertile irrigated gardens, orchards, grain fields, mulberry trees, and numerous rural settlements.

The defenders of Jaén likely included the Muslim garrison, locally mobilized troops, armed inhabitants, rural refugees, and approximately 160 Christian knights commanded by Álvar Pérez de Castro. Álvar was a member of the powerful Castro family and was the son of Pedro Fernández de Castro. His family had a long history of quarrels with Castilian kings, political exile, and temporary service at Muslim courts. The Christian force commanded by Álvar was most likely knights, retainers, and lesser nobles who were in his service. The commander of the Muslim force is not known nor is the total size of the defensive force. Some Christian chronicles claim that the defensive force was as large 53,000, however, such a figure is implausibly large and exaggerated.

The besieging force was composed of a coalition of the army of Ferdinand III of Castile; Castilian magnates and their retinues; municipal militias from towns including Ávila, Segovia, Sepúlveda, and Cuéllar; contingents of various military orders; and the Muslim forces of al–Bayyāsī of Baeza. Although there are no reliable estimates of the size of the besieging force, it is likely that the forces consisted of a few thousand men.

== The siege ==
Upon arrival at Jaén, Ferdinand established several encampments giving the defenders the impression that his primary goal would be to isolate and capture the city. Encampments were established south of the city near the Granada gate; to the northeast in the Fonsario district; and on the Santa Catalina ridge where the hilltop fortress could be observed. To avoid unnecessary casualties, Ferdinand kept his troops back from the fortified outworks. After confining the defenders, Ferdinand began the what is believed to be the primary purpose of his campaign, the destructive raiding of the countryside.

Ferdinand's campaign was conducted in the early summer when barley and wheat were being harvested in southern al–Andalus. To deprive food supplies to the Muslims, Ferdinand's troops destroyed crops; burned grain stocks; and cut down orchards. Such actions provoked retaliation on the part of the defenders in the form of sorties and surprise attacks outside the city walls. In such actions, the Muslims advanced as far as the Christian encampments; killing men; seizing horses and supplies; and inflicting damage before quickly retreating back into the city. Such quick raids seemed to have had little affect upon the siege that Ferdinand had put in place.

Aside from the destructive raids that Ferdinand's forces conducted on the countryside surrounding Jaén, there is no evidence that his army put much effort into storming or breaching the city walls. Ferdinand's army appears to have been organized principally for a mobile campaign rather than a prolonged reduction of a strongly fortified city. According to the Crónica de veinte reyes, the army had not come prepared to conduct a siege and lacked the siege engines necessary to overcome Jaén's defenses.

After a period of approximately sixteen days, Ferdinand ended the siege of Jaén and campaigned to Priego, Loja, Alhama, and the agricultural plains of Granada. Although Jaén had not fallen, its resources had been severely damaged; reconnaissance had been conducted; and its defenses tested. Remaining longer at Jaén would have served little purpose and would have deprived Ferdinand of the opportunity to strike out against other Almohad cities.

== Aftermath ==
Shortly after Ferdinand returned to Toledo in August 1225, al–Bayyāsī surrendered control of the fortresses of Martos and Andújar to the Castilians in fulfillment of the alliance agreement with Ferdinand. In 1230, Ferdinand attempted to capture Jaén again and failed. Even though Jaén remained unconquered, the delivery of Martos and Andújar enabled Ferdinand to maintain a permanent position in the upper Guadalquivir River Valley and become an arbiter of Andalusian political disputes, accepting homage, controlling fortresses, installing garrisons, and receiving territorial concessions.

Jaén remained under Muslim control until 1246. Following another siege by Ferdinand, Muḥammad I of Granada reached an agreement with the Castilian king under which Jaén was surrendered to Ferdinand, while Muḥammad became a vassal and secured recognition of his rule in Granada.

== See also ==
- Jaén, Spain
- List of Castilian Battles

== Citations ==
- Aguirre Sádaba, Francisco Javier; Jiménez Mata, María del Carmen (1979). Introducción al Jaén islámico: estudio geográfico–histórico (in Spanish). Jaén: Instituto de Estudios Giennenses. ISBN 84-00-04511-4.
- Barton, Simon (2005). "From Mercenary to Crusader: The Career of Álvar Pérez de Castro (d. 1239) Re–examined". In Harris, Julie; Martin, Therese (eds.). Church, State, Vellum, and Stone: Essays on Medieval Spain in Honor of John Williams. Leiden: Brill. pp. 111–129. ISBN 978-90-04-14537-5.
- Charlo Brea, Luis, ed. (1984). Crónica latina de los reyes de Castilla (in Spanish). Cádiz: Universidad de Cádiz. pp. 66–67. ISBN 84-600-3665-0.
- Eslava Galán, Juan (1987). "La campaña de 1225 y el primer cerco de Jaén por Fernando III". Boletín del Instituto de Estudios Giennenses (132). ISSN 0561-3590. OCLC 278941093.
- Eslava Galán, Juan (1988). "Las defensas almorávides de Jaén" (PDF). Boletín del Instituto de Estudios Giennenses (in Spanish) (133): 9–32. ISSN 0561-3590.
- Eslava Galán, Juan (1999). Los castillos de Jaén (in Spanish). Armilla, Granada: Ediciones Osuna. ISBN 84-89717-41-9.
- "Fernando III de Castilla y León, el Santo". Gran Enciclopedia Rialp (1991 ed.). Madrid: Ediciones Rialp.
- González Jiménez, Manuel (1988). En torno a los orígenes de Andalucía: La repoblación del siglo XIII (in Spanish). Seville: Universidad de Sevilla. ISBN 84-7405-398-6.
- González Jiménez, Manuel (2003). "Fernando III y la repoblación de Andalucía". Fernando III y su tiempo (1201–1252): VIII Congreso de Estudios Medievales (in Spanish). Ávila: Fundación Sánchez–Albornoz. pp. 207–232. ISBN 84-923109-3-6.
- González Jiménez, Manuel (2006). Fernando III el Santo: El rey que marcó el destino de España (in Spanish). Seville: Fundación José Manuel Lara. ISBN 978-84-96556-38-6.
- González, Julio (1980). Reinado y diplomas de Fernando III (in Spanish). Vol. 1. Córdoba: Publicaciones del Monte de Piedad y Caja de Ahorros de Córdoba.
- Guichard, Pierre (1990). Les musulmans de Valence et la Reconquête (XIe–XIIIe siècles) (in French). Vol. 1. Damascus: Institut Français de Damas.
- Hernández Segura, Amparo, ed. (1966). Crónica de la población de Ávila. Textos Medievales (in Spanish). Valencia: Anubar. pp. 41–45.
- Hernández Alonso, César; del Diego Simón, Enrique; Jabato Saro, Jesús María, eds. (1991). Crónica de veinte reyes (in Spanish). Burgos: Ayuntamiento de Burgos. pp. 300–301.
- Jiménez de Rada, Rodrigo (1987). Fernández Valverde, Juan (ed.). Historia de rebus Hispaniae sive Historia Gothica. Corpus Christianorum, Continuatio Mediaevalis (in Latin). Vol. 72. Turnhout: Brepols. ISBN 978-2-503-03721-9.
- Kennedy, Hugh (1996). Muslim Spain and Portugal: A Political History of al–Andalus. London: Longman. ISBN 978-0-582-49515-9.
- O'Callaghan, Joseph F. (2003). Reconquest and Crusade in Medieval Spain. Philadelphia: University of Pennsylvania Press. ISBN 978-0-8122-1889-3.
