= Jaén, Spain =

Jaén
- Municipality
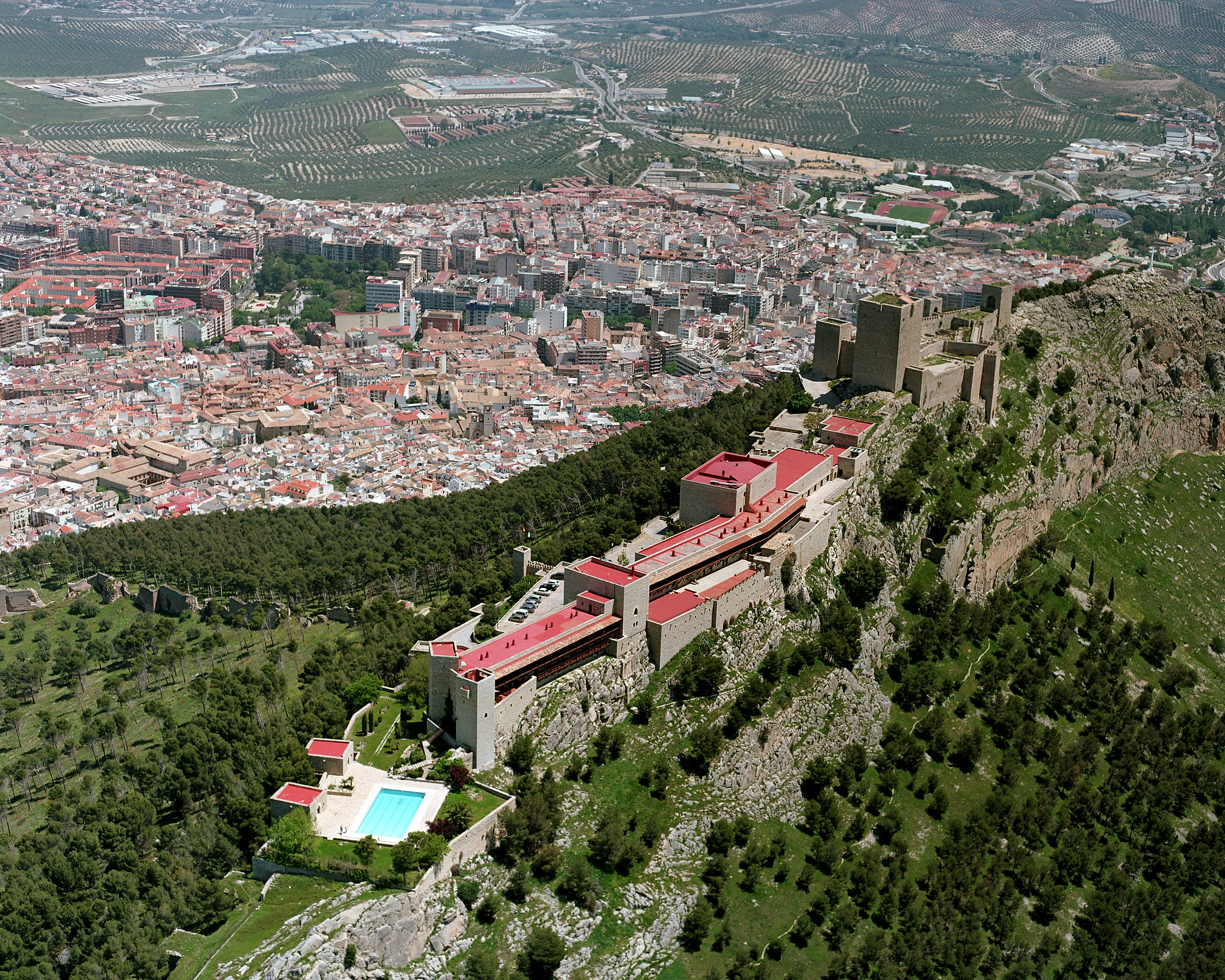
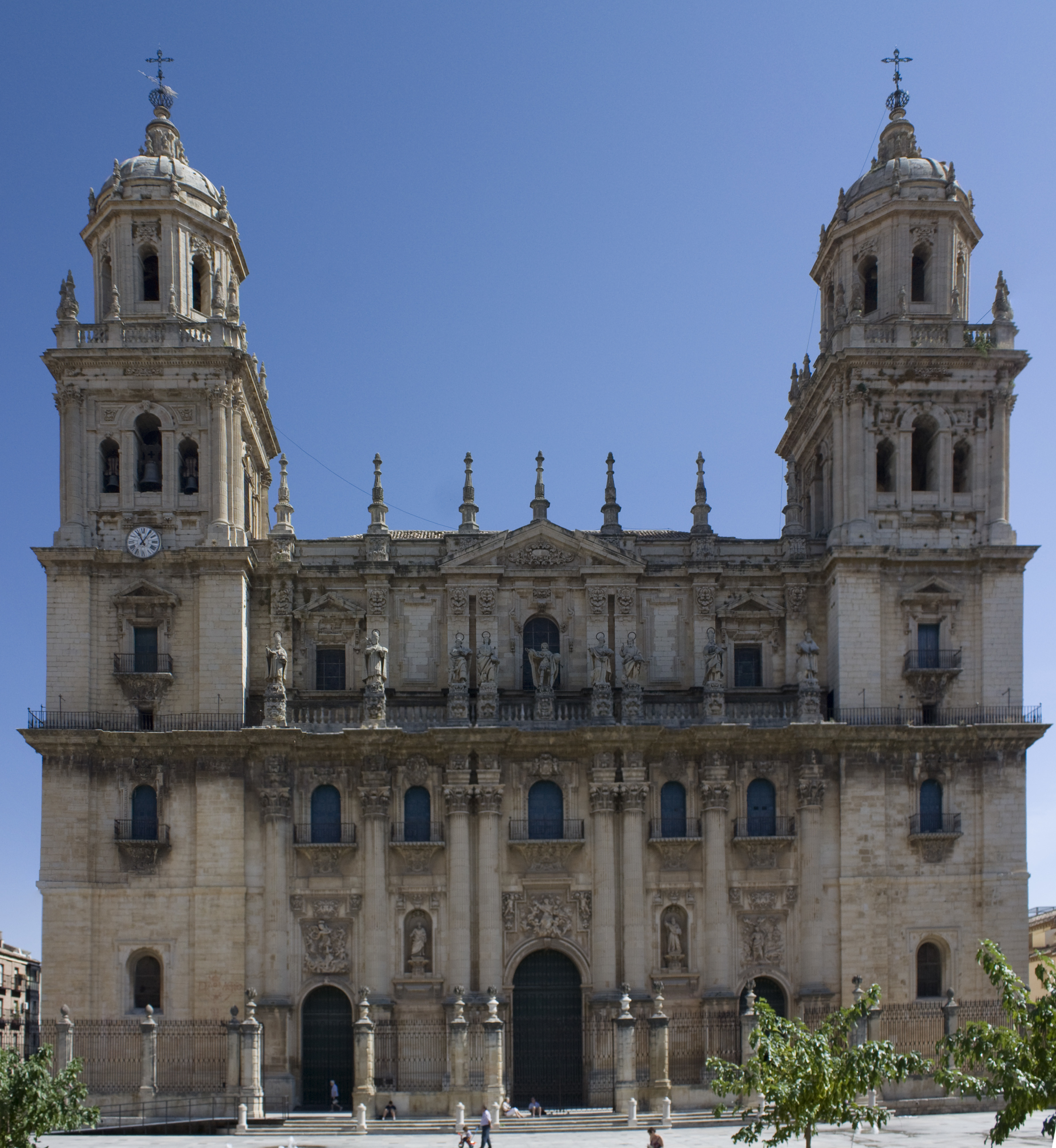
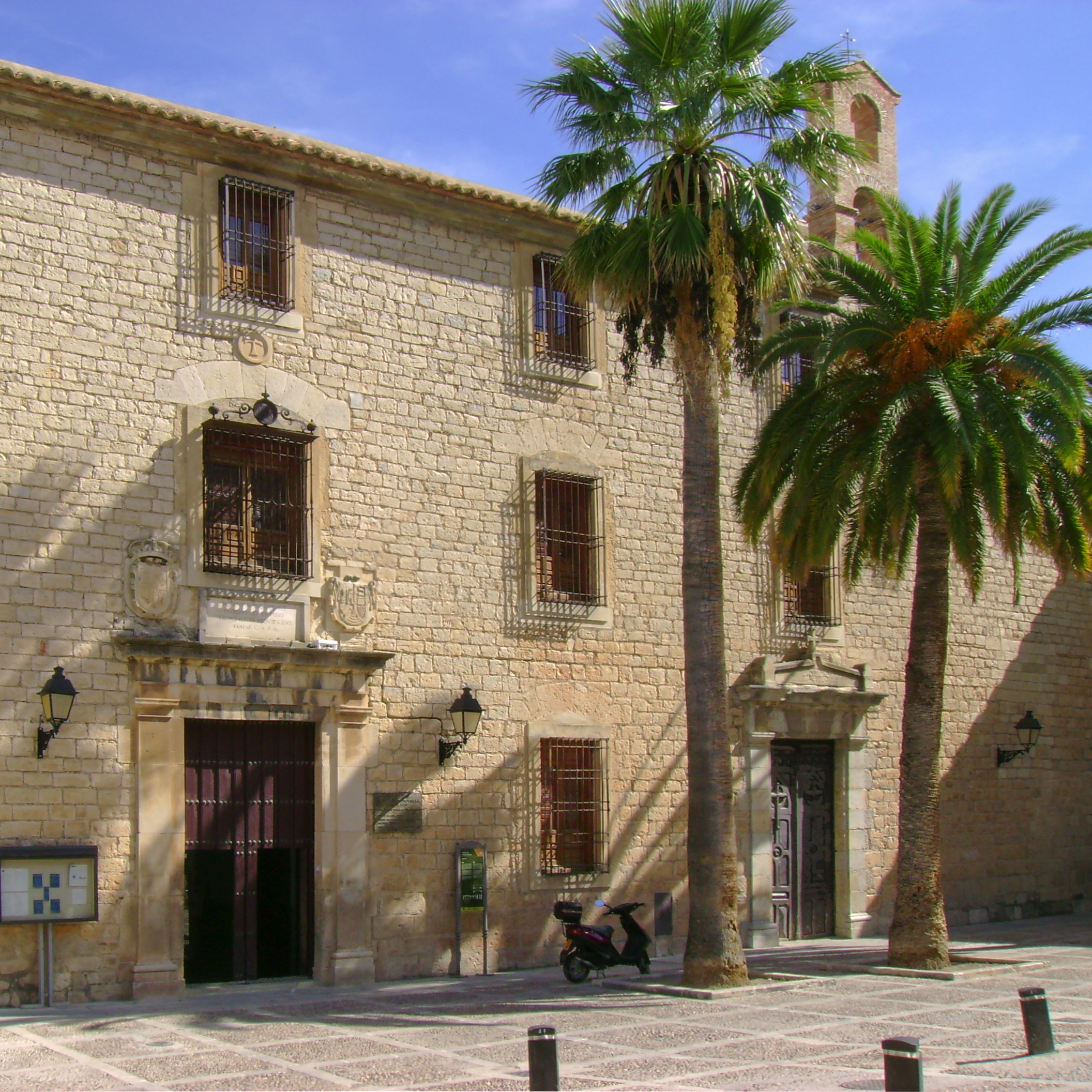
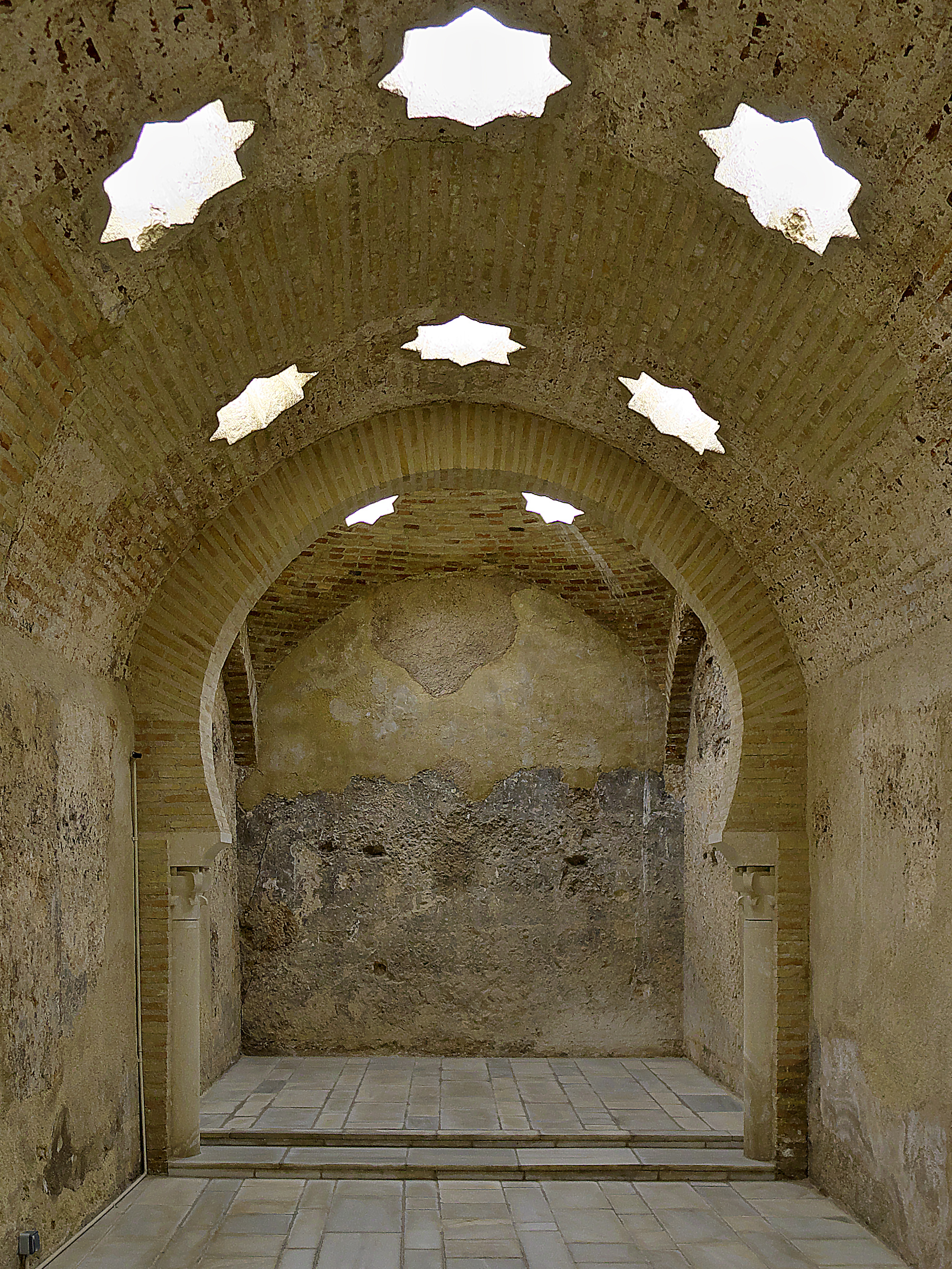
- Aerial view of Jaén and the Castle of Santa Catalina Cathedral Palacio de Villardompardo Arab Baths

- Flag Coat of arms
- Nickname: Capital del Santo Reino
- Interactive map of Jaén
- Coordinates: 37°46′0″N 3°46′16″W
- Country: Spain
- Autonomous community: Andalusia
- Province: Jaén

Government
  - Alcalde: Julio Millán (2025) (PSOE)

Area
  - Total: 424.30 km^{2} (163.82 sq mi)
- Elevation: 573 m (1,880 ft)
- Highest elevation: 815 m (2,674 ft)
- Lowest elevation: 330 m (1,080 ft)

Population (2025-01-01)
  - Total: 112,235
  - Density: 264.52/km^{2} (685.10/sq mi)
- Demonyms: jienense jiennense giennense jaenés, -sa jaenero, -a aurgitano, -a
- Time zone: UTC+1 (CET)
  - Summer (DST): UTC+2 (CEST)
- Postal code: 23001–23009
- Dialing code: 0034 953
- Website: www.aytojaen.es

Jaén (Spanish: [xaˈen]) is a municipality of Spain and the capital of the province of Jaén, in the autonomous community of Andalusia.

The city of Jaén is the administrative and industrial centre for the province. Industrial establishments in the city include chemical works, tanneries, distilleries, cookie factories, textile factories, as well as agricultural and olive oil processing machinery industry.

The layout of Jaén is determined by its position on the foothills of the Cerro de Santa Catalina, with steep, narrow streets, in the historic core.

Its population is 112,757 (2020), about one-sixth of the population of the province. Jaén had an increase in cultural tourism in the mid-2010s, having received 604,523 tourists in 2015, 10% more than in 2014.

== Etymology ==
The name is most likely derived from the Roman name Villa Gaiena (Villa of Gaius). It was called Jayyān during the time of Al-Andalus.

The inhabitants of the city are known as Jienenses.

== History ==
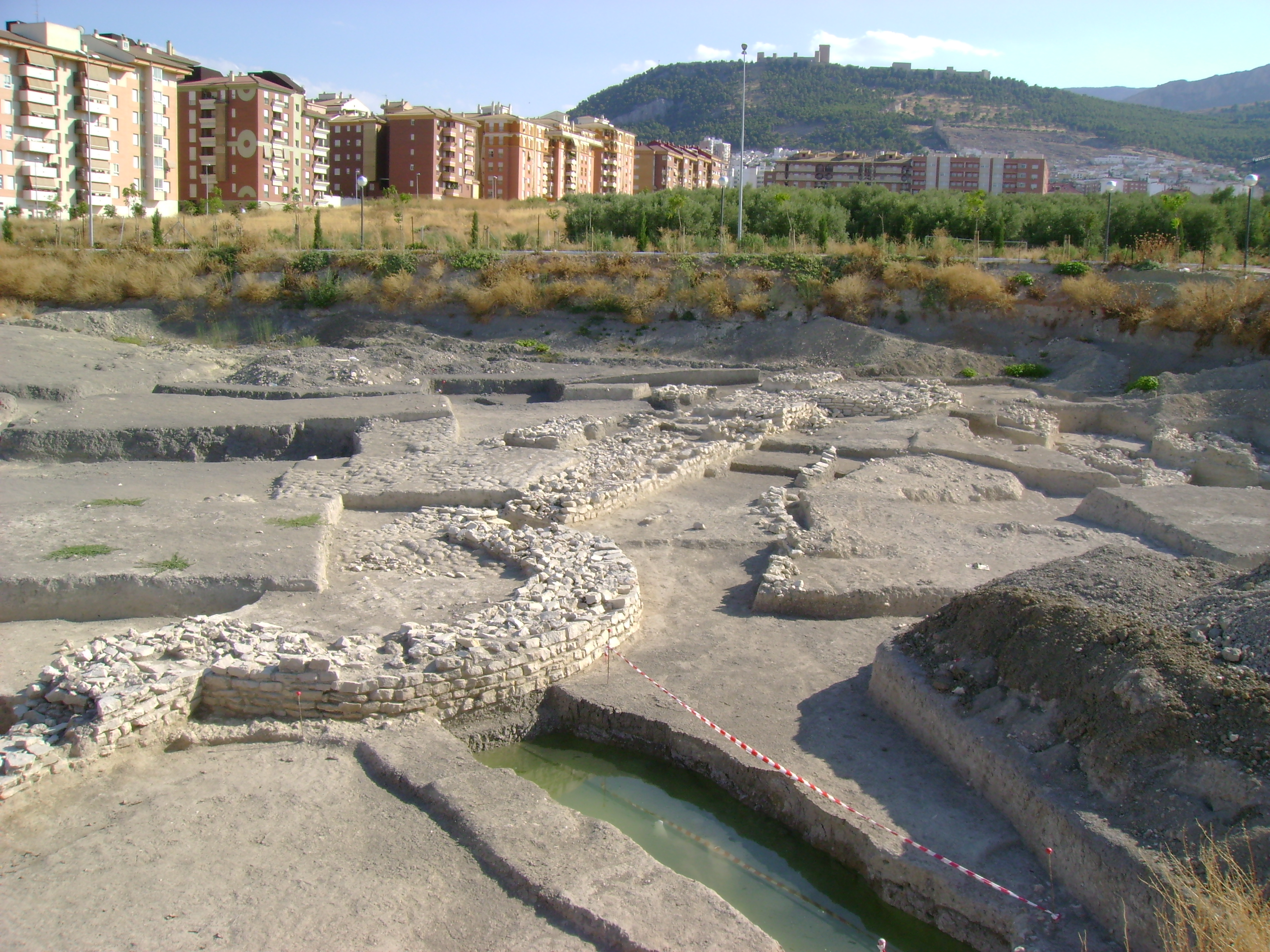
Remains of the Chalcolithic walls in Marroquíes Bajos

The area was populated since ancient times, with remains of city walls in the Marroquíes Bajos site in the north of the city reportedly dating back in time to the Chalcolithic, roughly four millennia ago.

Known by Roman sources as Aurgi (avrgi), similar names such as avringi, oringi, are also identified as referring to the same place. The city was seized by Scipio Africanus away from Carthage by 207 BC, in the context of the Second Punic War. Following the Roman conquest, as former allies of the Punics, the city had the status of civitas stipendaria (required to pay tribute and under military rule), probably enduring harsh conditions in this period. During the Roman Empire, in the time of the Flavian dynasty, Aurgi became a municipium, avrgi mvnicipivm flavivm.

Following the Umayyad conquest of the Iberian Peninsula, the name of Jayyān (جيان of unclear origin) was mentioned in Hispano-Arab sources already in the 8th century. Close to Córdoba, the city became the head of an important kūra in the emiral/caliphal period of Al-Andalus, extending across a territory with some similarities to the current province. During the turbulent 11th century, in the context of the Fitna of al-Andalus, the wider kūra was territory in dispute between the most powerful neighbouring taifas, such as Córdoba, Granada or Toledo, splitting up its territory. Jaén was conquered by Habbus al-Muzaffar, leader of the Zirid Taifa of Granada. Decades after the final demise of the caliphate of Córdoba, Jaén was conquered by the Almoravids in 1091.

Taken in 1159 by Ibn Mardanīš (the Rey Lobo, ruler of Valencia opposed to the spread of the Almohad Empire), his collaborator (and father-in-law) Ibn Hamušk surrendered and yielded Jaén to the almohads in 1169.

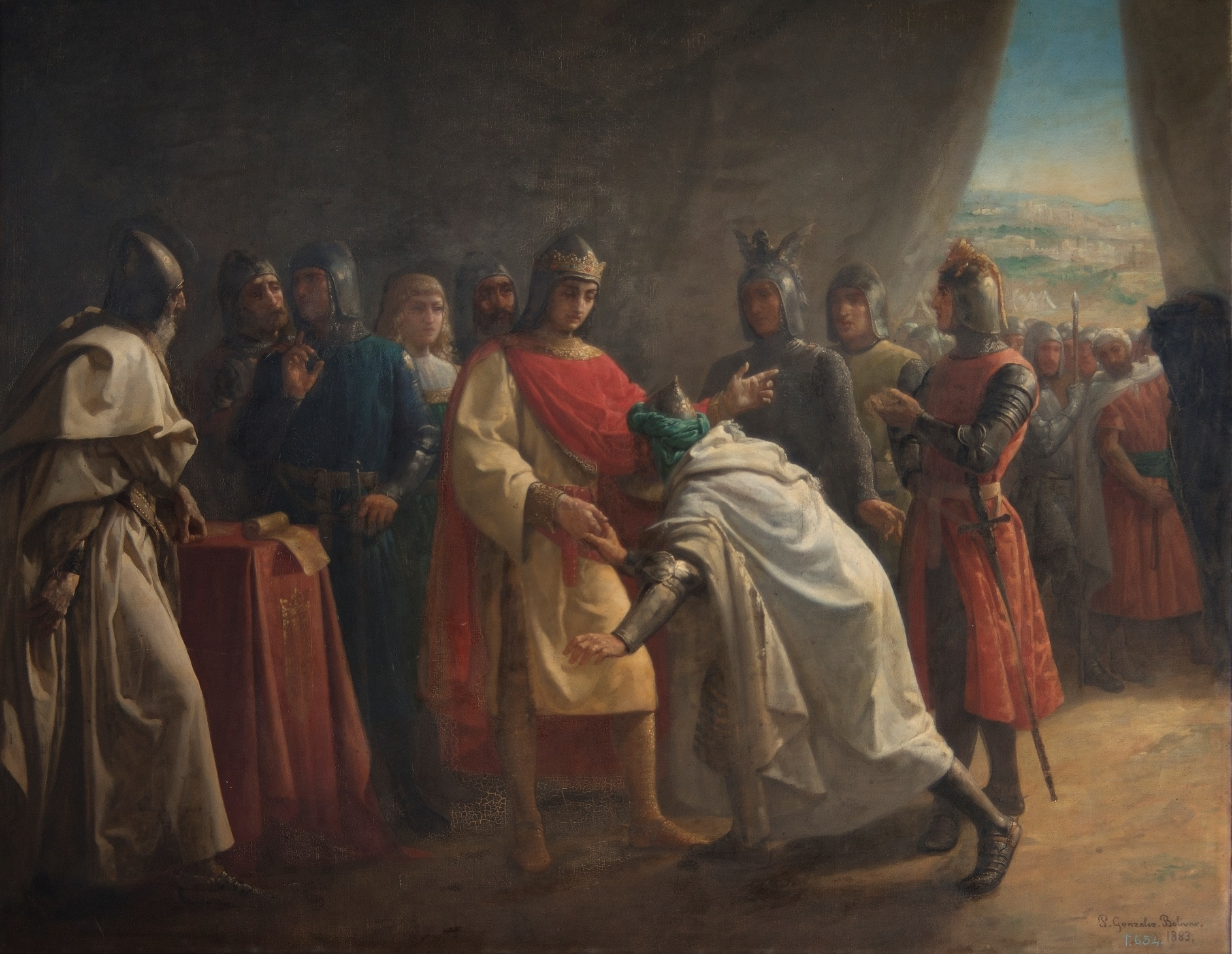
19th century historicist painting illustrating the surrendering of Jaén by Muhammad I to Ferdinand III in 1246.

In 1225, Ferdinand III of Castile unsuccessfully laid siege to the city (defended by strong walls built during the Almoravid period) with help from Al-Bayyasi, ruler of the Taifa of Baeza, that had just become a vassal state of the Kingdom of Castile. The city was besieged again in 1230 by Ferdinand, who lifted the siege after the news of the death of his father, Alfonso IX of León. Depleted from its defences and surrounding fields, the city was surrendered by Muhammad I of Granada to Ferdinand III on 28 February 1246. Also in 1246, the city was granted a fuero (charter) similar to that of Toledo, becoming in turn the model for the fueros granted to Jódar (1272), Arjona (1284), Alcalá la Real (1341) and Priego (1341). Following the conquest, by 1248–49, the Diocese of Baeza was moved to Jaén.

For the rest of the Middle Ages, the concejo or comunidad de villa y tierra of Jaén controlled a land that ranged from 1000 to 1600 km^{2}, roughly delimited by the Guadalquivir to the North, the Arroyovil to the East, the Arroyo Salado de los Villares to the West, and the Sierra Sur de Jaén and Sierra Mágina mountain ranges to the South. Despite nominally featuring as the head of the Kingdom of Jaén since the conquest, the importance of Jaén within the demarcation was balanced by those of the cities of Baeza and Úbeda. It only began to stand out in relation to its growing strategic importance closer to the border with the Kingdom of Granada, consolidating its military and administrative functions. Unlike those cities, that developed an important textile craftmanship activity, Jaén's economic activity remained nonetheless largely agricultural well entered the Early Modern period.

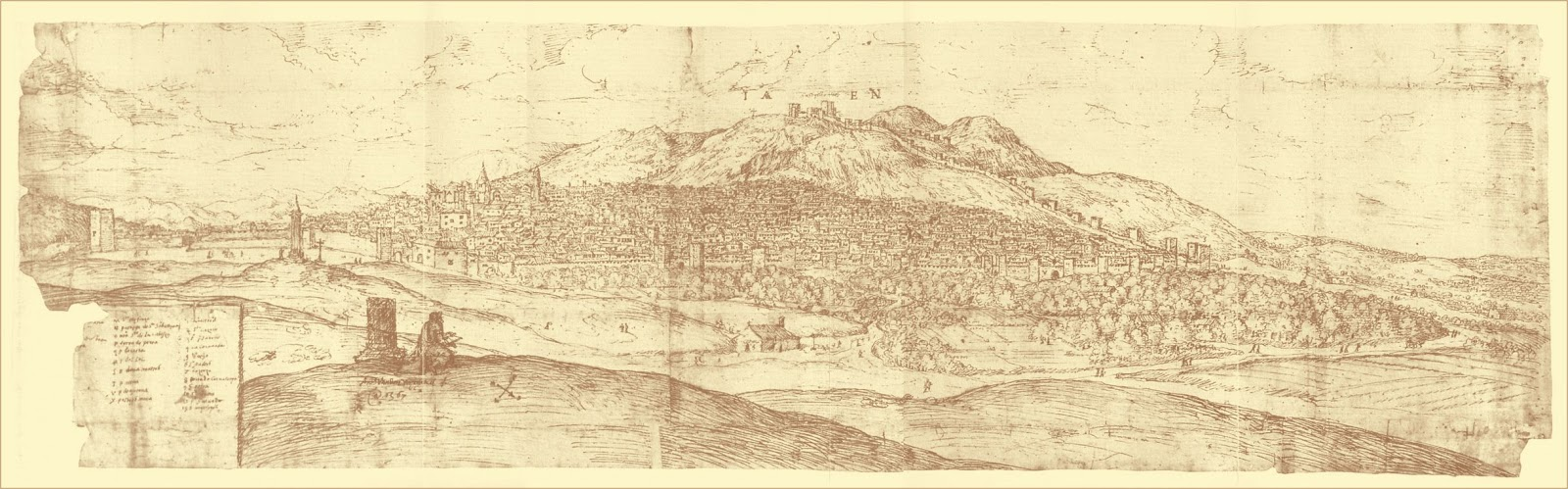
View of Jaén by Anton van den Wyngaerde (1567)

== Name ==
The city's formal name is La Muy Noble y muy Leal Ciudad de Jaén, Guarda y Defendimiento de los Reynos de Castilla (The very noble and very loyal city of Jaén, guard and defense of the Kingdoms of Castile), given by King Enrique II of Castile to specify the city's privileges and honor its role in defending his kingdom against the Arabs.

== Geography ==
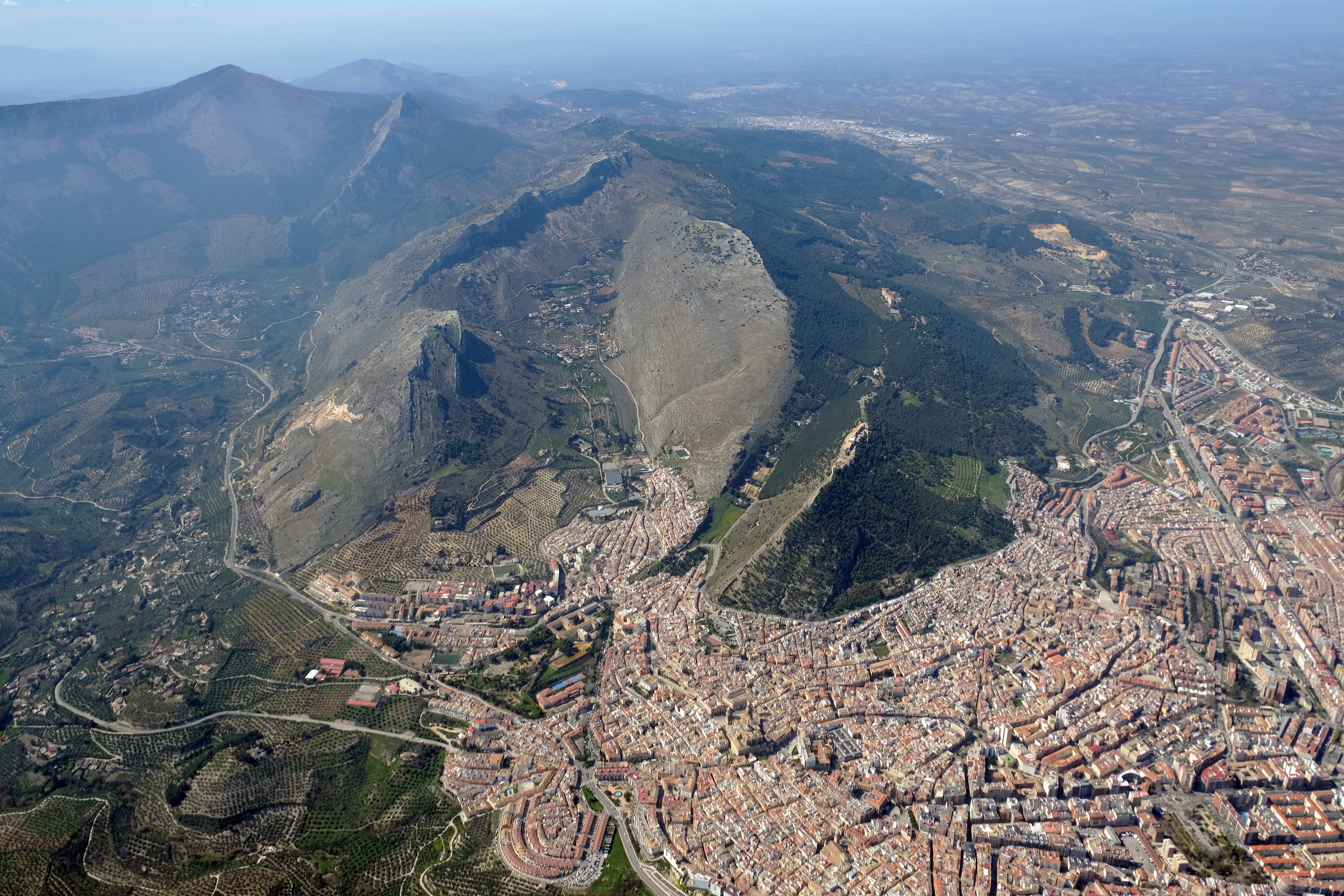
Jaén and Sierra de Jabalcuz

=== Location ===
The city lies at the foot of the Sierra de Jabalcuz, one of the subranges of the Subbaetic System, the inner system of the Baetic Mountains which leaves the Guadalquivir Valley to the North. The surroundings of the city are rich in small Mesozoic karstic aquifers. The Guadalbullón river flows close to the city. Jaén is approximately the antipode of Tauranga, New Zealand.

=== Climate ===
Jaén has a hot-summer Mediterranean climate (Köppen climate classification: Csa), closely bordering on a cold semi-arid climate (BSk) with dry, hot summers and mild, moderately wet winters. Jaén has a July high of 33.9 °C (93.0 °F), and mean low of 21.3 °C (70.3 °F) with a mean temperature of 27.6 °C (81.7 °F). This is slightly less than the daily mean of Seville which has the hottest daily summer mean in Western Europe with 28.2 °C (82.8 °F). Despite its inland location and altitude of around 600 metres (2,000 ft), in winter Jaén averages only one snowy day and three days with lows under 0 °C (32 °F). Jaén gets around 2800-3000 sunshine hours on average.

Climate data for Jaén, 580 metres (1,900 ft) 1991-2020 averages, 1920-present extremes
Month	Jan	Feb	Mar	Apr	May	Jun	Jul	Aug	Sep	Oct	Nov	Dec	Year
Record high °C (°F)	25.3 (77.5)	26.4 (79.5)	31.0 (87.8)	35.0 (95.0)	40.3 (104.5)	42.5 (108.5)	46.0 (114.8)	44.2 (111.6)	41.2 (106.2)	35.0 (95.0)	29.6 (85.3)	25.0 (77.0)	46.0 (114.8)
Mean daily maximum °C (°F)	12.2 (54.0)	13.8 (56.8)	17.2 (63.0)	19.5 (67.1)	24.3 (75.7)	29.9 (85.8)	33.9 (93.0)	33.4 (92.1)	27.7 (81.9)	22.3 (72.1)	15.8 (60.4)	13.1 (55.6)	21.9 (71.5)
Daily mean °C (°F)	8.7 (47.7)	10.0 (50.0)	12.8 (55.0)	14.9 (58.8)	19.1 (66.4)	24.1 (75.4)	27.6 (81.7)	27.4 (81.3)	22.7 (72.9)	18.1 (64.6)	12.3 (54.1)	9.7 (49.5)	17.3 (63.1)
Mean daily minimum °C (°F)	5.2 (41.4)	6.2 (43.2)	8.5 (47.3)	10.3 (50.5)	13.8 (56.8)	18.2 (64.8)	21.3 (70.3)	21.3 (70.3)	17.6 (63.7)	13.8 (56.8)	8.8 (47.8)	6.3 (43.3)	12.6 (54.7)
Record low °C (°F)	−7.8 (18.0)	−8.0 (17.6)	−3.0 (26.6)	0.0 (32.0)	1.4 (34.5)	8.0 (46.4)	9.2 (48.6)	11.0 (51.8)	7.4 (45.3)	1.0 (33.8)	−0.9 (30.4)	−6.0 (21.2)	−8.0 (17.6)
Average precipitation mm (inches)	53 (2.1)	50 (2.0)	58 (2.3)	57 (2.2)	39 (1.5)	15 (0.6)	1 (0.0)	9 (0.4)	28 (1.1)	52 (2.0)	62 (2.4)	64 (2.5)	488 (19.1)
Average rainy days (≥ 1.0mm)	6.7	6.1	6.2	7.2	4.9	1.7	0.3	0.7	2.7	5.7	6.5	6.8	55.5
Average snowy days	0.4	0.3	0.3	0	0	0	0	0	0	0	0.1	0.1	1.2
Average relative humidity (%)	70	64	58	57	51	43	38	41	51	61	69	70	56
Source: AEMET

== Demographics ==
Historical population

Year	Pop.	±%
1842	17,387	—
1857	21,520	+23.8%
1877	23,045	+7.1%
1887	24,070	+4.4%
1900	25,566	+6.2%
1910	28,308	+10.7%
1920	33,402	+18.0%
1930	39,096	+17.0%
1940	51,308	+31.2%

Year	Pop.	±%
1950	61,247	+19.4%
1960	64,553	+5.4%
1970	77,317	+19.8%
1981	95,783	+23.9%
1991	103,260	+7.8%
2001	112,590	+9.0%
2011	116,469	+3.4%
2021	111,915	−3.9%

Source: INE

== Culture ==
=== Landmarks ===
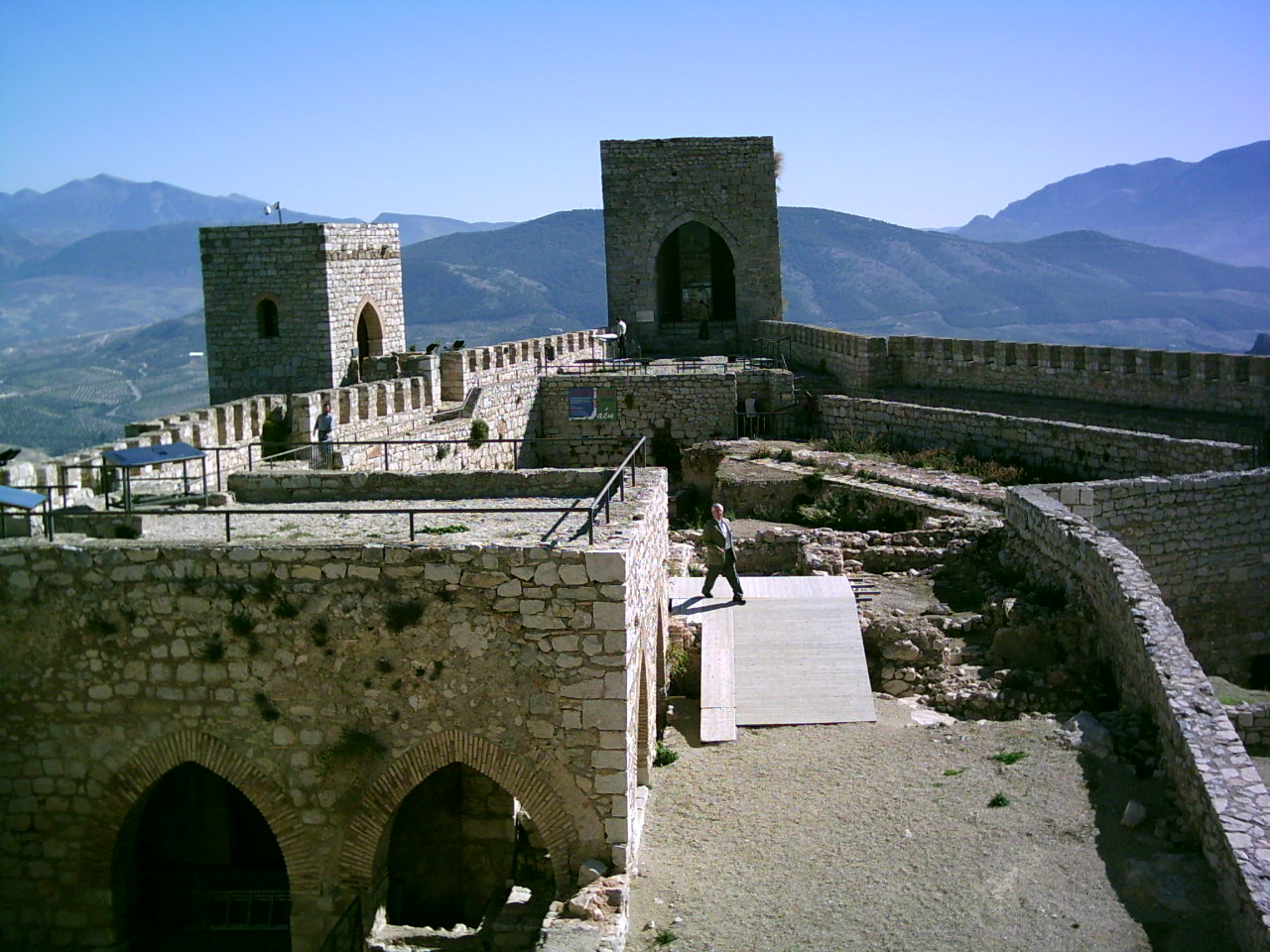
Saint Catalina's castle.

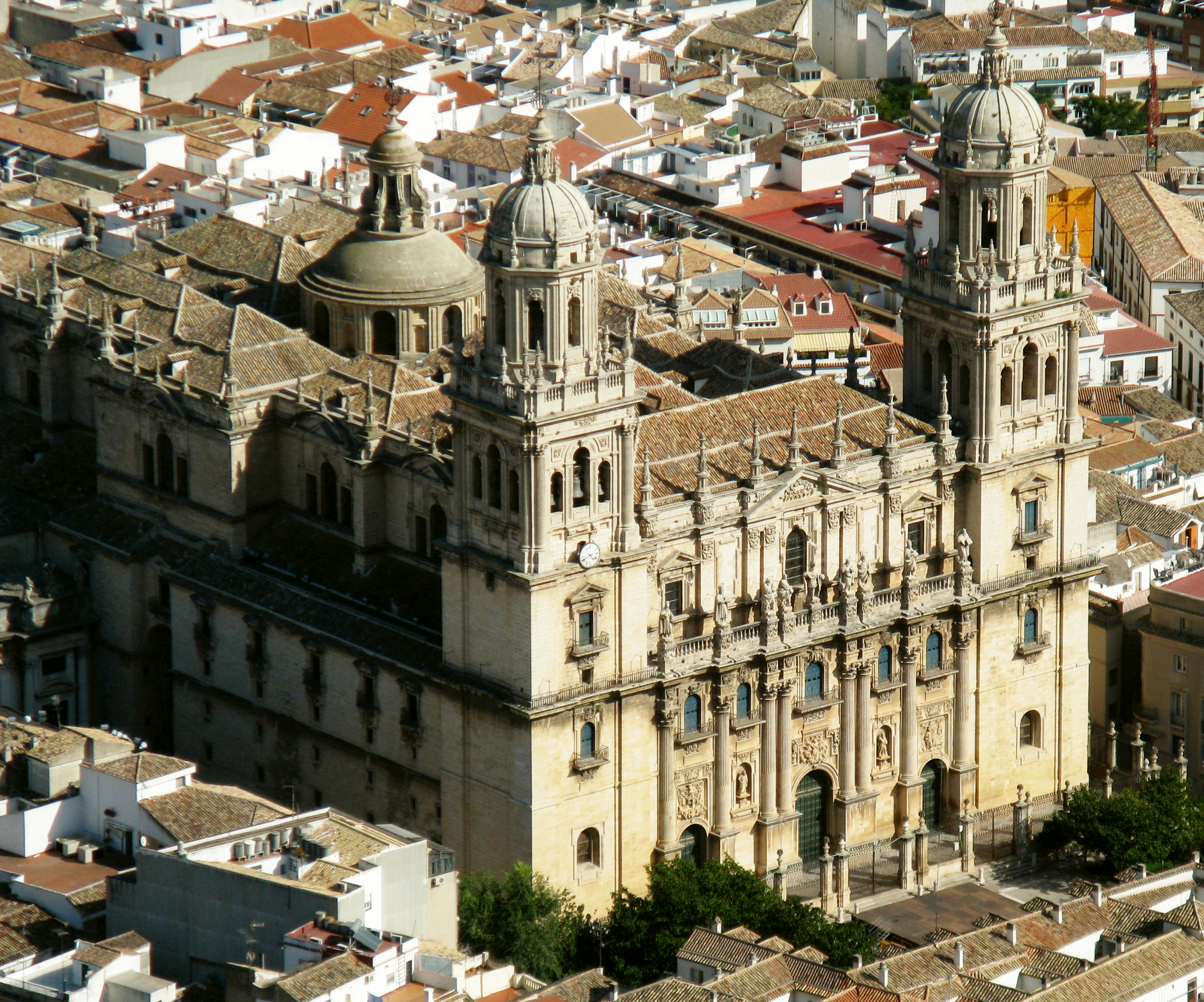
Jaén Cathedral.

Saint Catherine's Castle (Castillo de Santa Catalina) sits on the top of a hill overlooking the city. Previously there had existed a fortress of Arabic origin (Abrehui's castle), of which some remains still exist. The current construction is of Christian origin, raised after the conquest of the city by Ferdinand III of Castile, called the Saint, in 1246.

Jaén Cathedral is one of the most important Renaissance-style cathedrals. Construction began in 1570 and was completed in 1802. It is dedicated to the Assumption of the Virgin, and was built to shelter the relic of the Holy Face, or Veil of Veronica, lodged at the major chapel and exhibited to the public every Friday. Due to the length of time in its construction, different artistic styles can be appreciated, the most prominent being Renaissance; Andrés de Vandelvira the most important architect. He is the greatest exponent of the Andalusian Renaissance. It aspires to be listed as a World Heritage Site by UNESCO.

The Arab Baths (Baños Arabes) in Jaén are among the largest Islamic bathhouses preserved in Spain. They can be visited under Villardompardo's Palace (another important landmark in the city). The baths function was the purification of all visitors to the city. Nowadays, the baths are not in use, though are a tourist and historical attraction.

Other landmarks are the Museum of Arts and Popular Customs, the International Museum of Naïf Art, San Andrés's Chapel, the Provincial Museum of Jaén (which shelters an important collection of archaeological Iberian remains), Saint Ildefonso's church, La Magdalena church, etc.

=== Music ===
The most important event is the International Piano Competition Premio Jaén (in Spanish: Concurso Internacional de Piano Premio Jaén) that is the oldest and most important piano competition in Spain. It started in 1953 with Pablo Castillo García-Negrete, an architect who began to donate the first cash prizes of only some thousands of pesetas. Nowadays the prize consist of €57,000 and the recording of classical music albums in professional studios. The last winner of this significant competition was the Chinese pianist Yin Yu Qin, in 2008, in the fiftieth competition.

There are other events such as the Ciclos de Rock and the Lagarto Rock Festival.

=== Language ===
The language spoken in Jaén is the official language of Spain, Spanish. The variety of Spanish spoken in this province displays some of the characteristics of Andalusian speech, such as dropping of final -s in plural formation: gafa for gafas (and consequent final vowel opening) in the word "glasses", or dropping of /d/ in intervocalic position in regular participles of verbs: e.g. acabao for acabado. Some of these variants can be consulted in the Diccionario de Vocabulario Andaluz compiled by the local lexicographer Alcalá Venceslada, which was reprinted by the University of Jaén some years ago. This dictionary also compiles some other variants of Andalusian present in other parts of the autonomous community.

There are different expressions typical of the area, namely the interjection "¡ea!" (also present in other dialectal variants) which has no particular exact meaning or "¡lavística!" /la'vistika/, which is believed to be a contraction of the expression "la Vírgen de Tíscar", a popular virgin of the province, although there are no exact data to confirm the origin of the last expression which is, nevertheless, widespread among speakers of the province.

=== Leisure and entertainment ===
==== Festivals ====
Feria de San Lucas: On 18 October Jaén celebrates its biggest festivity. It lasts more than a week where jienenses and visitors can enjoy music, Sevillanas dancing, gastronomy, culture and tradition.

Romeria de Santa Catalina: Procession in the hill with the same name where the Castle is located to honour the Saint Patron of the City. It is typical to eat sardines and barbecue in the forest around the Castle.

San Anton: The 16 January it is celebrated the fires of San Anton. In the different neighbourhoods there are built bonfires and people eat and sing around them celebrating the beginning of the year. Also the International Urban Race of San Anton takes place that night, the fifth in the Spanish Ranking of Athleticism.

Virgen de la Capilla: The 11 June Jaén celebrates the appearance of the Virgin Mary in the city. A weekend where there are flower offerings and a Virgin procession, as well as traditional activities to show the culture of the city.

===== Holy Week =====
The tradition of celebrating the Holy Week in the city started in the Middle Ages, and nowadays it has been declared "Bien de Interés Turístico-Cultural Andaluz" since 2006 and "Fiesta de Interés Turístico Nacional de Andalucía". From Palm Sunday until Resurrection Sunday 17 catholic brotherhoods carry out their processions through the streets of Jaén. Its most well known procession features an image known as "the grandfather" , which parades around the city center during the early hours of good Friday, otherwise known as "la madrugá".

=== Gastronomy ===
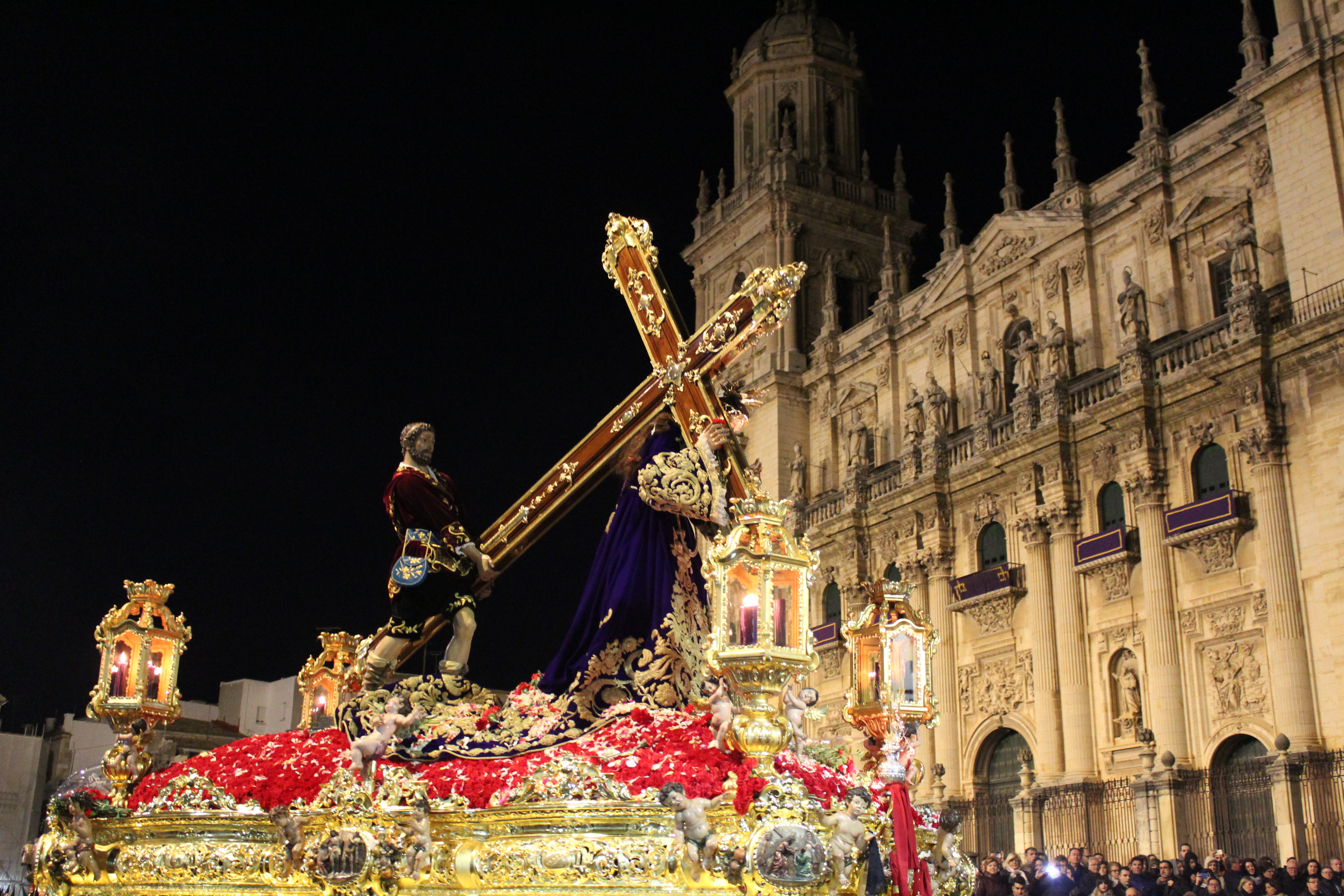
Holy week in Jaén.

Jaén's gastronomy is varied, emphasising local dishes such as the pipirrana (tomato, green peppers, breadcrumbs, garlic shoots, olive oil, vinegar, salt and hard-boiled egg); "spinach a la Jaén" (garlic, croûtons, spiced sausage, bayleaf, egg, orange zest and vinegar); "rice a la Jaén" (very weak), "veal with chopped garlic", "trout from the rivers of Jaén" (trout, butter, chunks of ham with bacon, parsley, white wine and salt), "ajo blanco a la Jaén" (raw almond, olive oil, eggs, garlic, salt, vinegar and water).

Among the most well-known confectioneries of Jaén is "rice pudding", "gachas of Jaén" (a sort of porridge), "pestiños", "gusanillos" and "ochíos".

In Jaén, eating tapas is common; there are numerous bars where, when purchasing a beer, the customer also receives a free snack to accompany their drink. The tapas vary from place to place and in some bars it is possible to choose from a tapas menu, though this is not normally the case.

== Transport ==
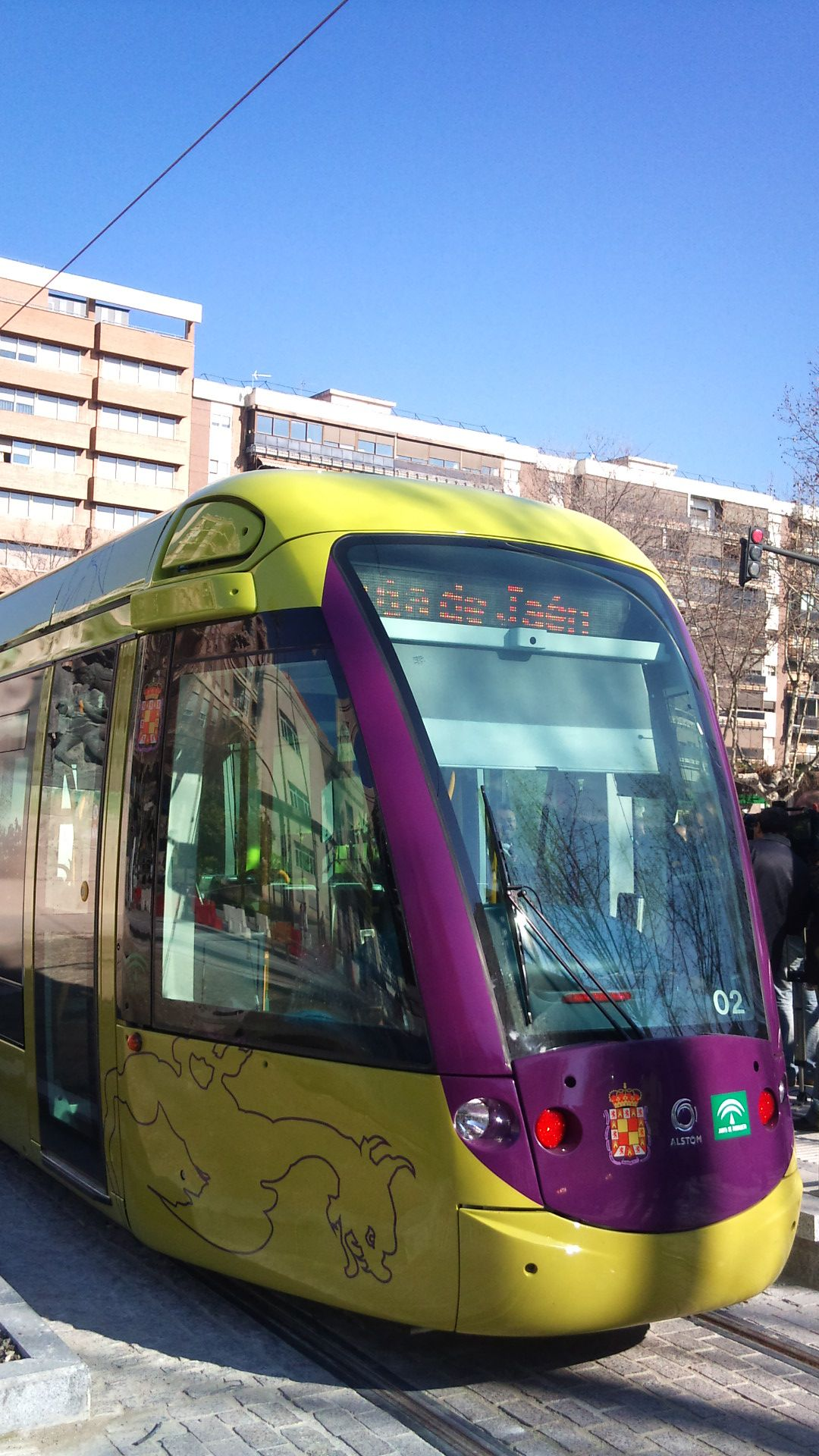
Jaén Tram.

=== Public transport ===
==== Bus ====
Jaén has 26 service lines that connect the various neighbourhoods of the capital, being able to use the metro card consortium. Buses are characterised by their yellow colour. Jaén has frequent connections to Granada, Málaga, Córdoba and other Spanish cities from its central bus station, placed in the city centre. Jaén Bus Station has been declared "Bien de Interes Cultural" due to its modern representative architecture.

==== Tram ====
The tram system in Jaén opened in 2011 but within two weeks was suspended and has remained out of service since then. In 2021, plans were made to reopen the line after renovation. The reopening is expected in late 2026.

==== Train ====
Jaén is served by the Jaén railway station, terminal of the Madrid–Jaén high speed railway line. Jaén is also connected to Córdoba and Sevilla by train.

==== Airport ====
Jaén does not have an airport. The closest airports to the city are Granada Airport (65 km) and Málaga Airport (136 km).

== Education ==
The University of Jaén currently consists of approximately 18,000 students and 27 degree courses. This university is present in the city, in the Campus "Las Lagunillas", and also in Úbeda and Linares with some of the degree courses. It is a modern university, founded in 1993, and has large foreign student population. The university has signed international exchanges with The United States of America, Asia, several American countries and a great Erasmus experience within more than 15 European countries.

== Sports ==
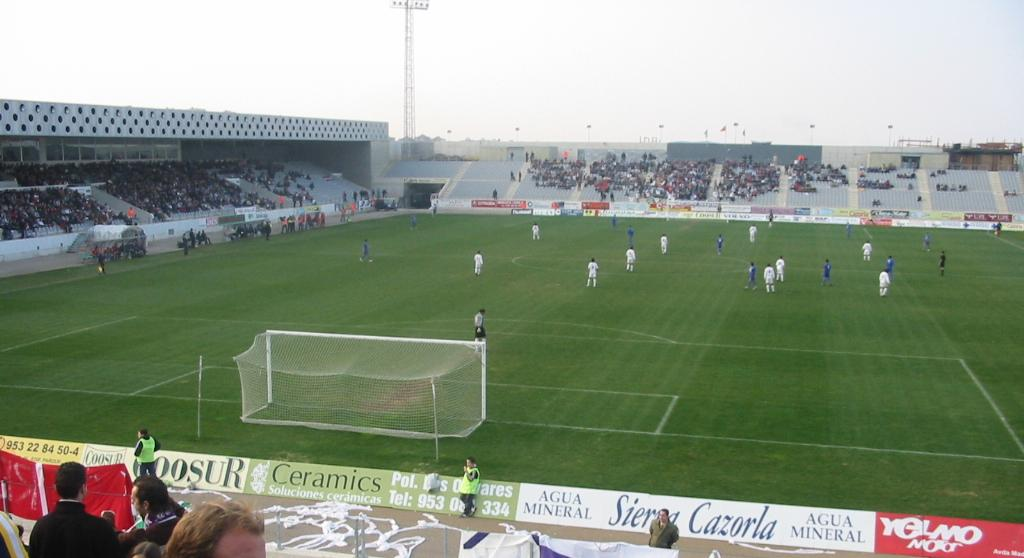
Nuevo Estadio de La Victoria, home of Real Jaén

The city's football team is Real Jaén, who play in the Nuevo Estadio de La Victoria.

The city has two major sporting facilities: the Fuentezuelas and the Salobreja, together with the university sports facilities. Trekking and climbing associations also exist, such as El Lagarto and Jabalcuz.

The Vía Verde del Aceite a former railway that ran from Jaén to Puente Genil in the province of Córdoba, is now used for recreational cycling walking and running.

There are various competitions which have a great international importance, for example, those related to chess and athletics.

The city has a futsal team, Jaén FS, and the team plays in the main League Primera División de Futsal.

== See also ==
- List of municipalities in Jaén
- Town hall of Jaén
- Hymn to Jaén

== Bibliography ==
- Alcázar Hernández, Eva Mª (2003). "Formación y articulación de un concejo fronterizo: Jaén en el Siglo XIII". Arqueología y Territorio Medieval. 10 (2). Jaén: UJA Editorial: 255–286. doi:10.17561/aytm.v10i2.1561.
- Castillo Armenteros, Juan Carlos (2009). "Jaén's castles, fortresses and walled sites" (PDF). Jaen Journal on Approximation. 1 (2). Universidad de Jaén: 45M–49M. ISSN 1889-3066.
- Chamocho Cantudo (2017). Los fueros de los reinos de Andalucía: de Fernando III a los Reyes Católicos. Madrid: Agencia Estatal Boletín Oficial del Estado. ISBN 978-84-340-2414-4.
- Collantes de Terán Sánchez, Antonio (2004). "Las ciudades andaluzas en la transición de la edad media a la moderna" (PDF). Boletín de la Real academia Sevillana de Buenas Letras: Minervae Baeticae (32). Seville: Real Academia Sevillana de Buenas Letras: 31–124. ISSN 0214-4395.
- Eslava Galán, Juan (1987). "La campaña de 1225 y el primer cerco de Jaén por Fernando III" (PDF). Boletín del Instituto de Estudios Giennenses (132): 23–38. ISSN 0561-3590 – via Dialnet.
- Espinar Moreno, Manuel (2000). Granada en el siglo XI. Ziríes y almorávides. Antología de textos para el estudio de la época (PDF). Granada: Método Ediciones. ISBN 84-7933-152-6.
- Gutiérrez Pérez, José Carlos (2019). "La organización del territorio andalusí: el ejemplo de la cora de Jaén". Argentaria (19): 34–37. ISSN 2255-226X – via Dialnet.
- Martos Quesada, Juan (2013). "El ejercicio de la consulta jurídica en Al-Andalus: los muftíes de la cora de Jaén" (PDF). Revista del Instituto Egipcio de Estudios Islámicos (41): 87–108. ISSN 1132-3485. Archived from the original (PDF) on 8 October 2018.
- Pestaña Parras, Manuel (2011). "Jaén romano" (PDF). Revista de Claseshistoria (260). ISSN 1989-4988 – via Dialnet.
- Vallvé Bermejo, Joaquín (1969). "La división territorial en la España Musulmana. La Cora de Jaén". Al-Andalus. 34 (1). Madrid: 55–82. ISSN 0304-4335.
- Vidal Castro, Francisco (2003). "Almorávides y almohades en al-Andalus y el Magreb". Triángulo de al-Andalus: Rabat, Alcazaba de los Udaya (PDF). Granada: Fundación el Legado Andalusí. pp. 75–87. ISBN 84-932923-3-8. Archived from the original (PDF) on 10 April 2019.
- Vidal Castro, Francisco (2009–2011). "El imperio almohade: historia y repercusión en la provincia de Jaén" (PDF). Alcazaba (9–11): 59–90. ISSN 1886-1180 – via Dialnet.
