= Siege of Jaén (1245–1246) =

1245-46 battle of the Spanish Reconquista

- Part of the Reconquista
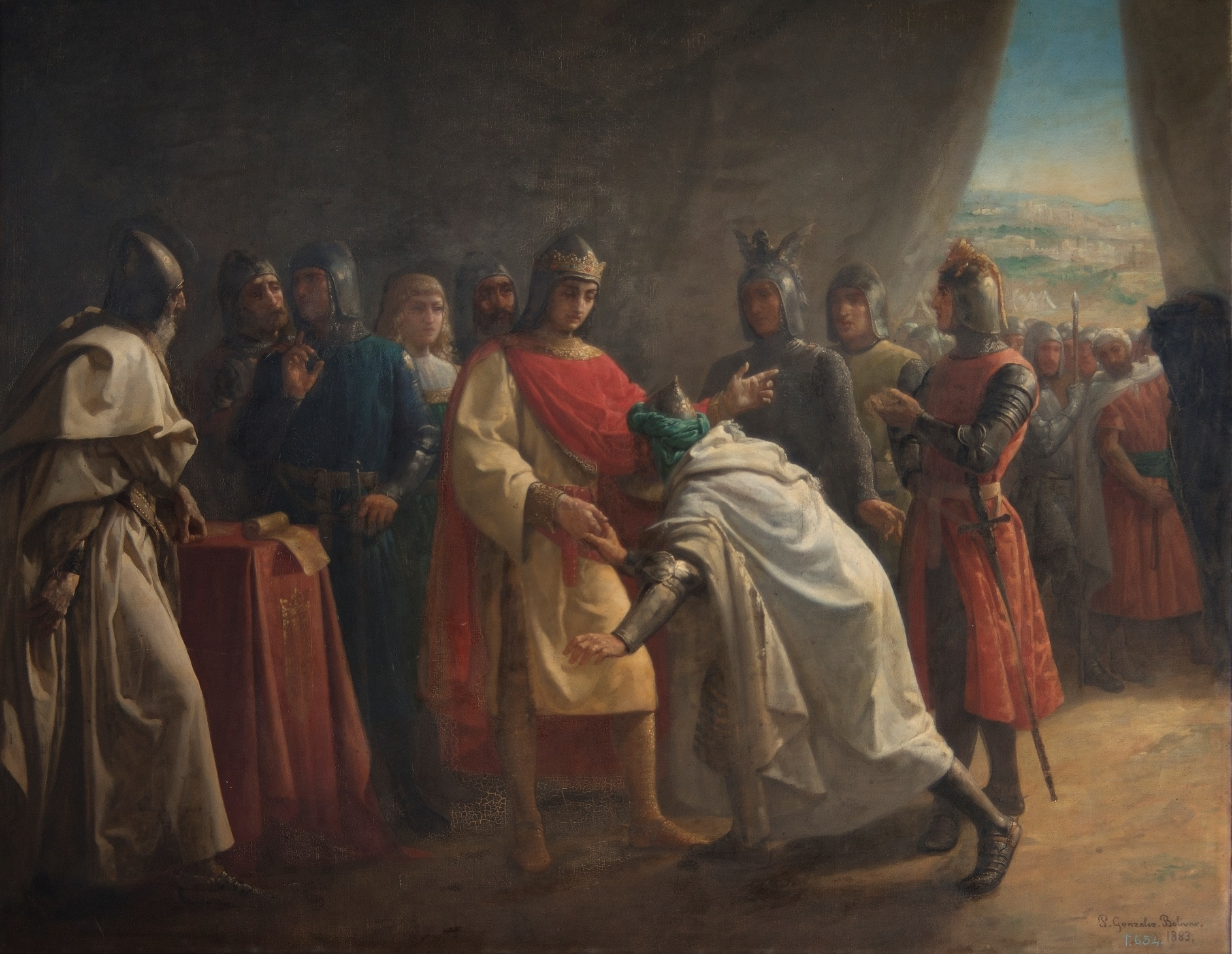
- Muhammad I of Granada surrendering Jaén to Ferdinand III of Castile and agreeing to be his vassal. 1883 painting by Pedro González Bolívar.
Date	8 August 1245–28 February 1246
Location	Jaén, Province of Jaén, Spain
Result	Handing over of the city of Jaén to Castile after the signing of the Pact of Jaén.

Belligerents
Crown of Castile; Order of Santiago	Emirate of Granada

Commanders and leaders
Ferdinand III of Castile; Pelayo Pérez Correa	Muhammad I of Granada

Strength
Unknown	Unknown

Casualties and losses
Unknown	Unknown

Location of Jaén within Andalusia

The Siege of Jaén (1245–1246) was the final siege of the city conducted by King Ferdinand of Castile during the Reconquista. In the episode of 1245–1246, Ferdinand and his ally, the Order of Santiago successfully captured the city after Muhammad I of Granada agreed to surrender the city in exchange for recognition as Granada's ruler.

== Background ==
Ferdinand had attempted to capture the fortified city of Jaén in 1225 and in 1230. In both cases, he chose to end the sieges after a relatively short period of time. After the end of Ferdinand's siege in 1230, the Jaén fortress remained under the control of Ibn Hūd al-Mutawakkil. In 1233, the city subsequently passed to Muhammad I, whose revolt against Ibn Hūd began at nearby Arjona in 1232 and ultimately led to the establishment of the Nasrid Emirate of Granada. Jaén then became a part of Muhammad I's emerging new Muslim state. Muhammad I acquired Guadix/Baza and neighboring territories in 1233; Granada and Almería in 1238; and Málaga in 1238–39. In 1245, the importance of Jaén had grown as it had become the northernmost fortress of Muhammad I's Emirate stretching south to Granada and east to the Mediterranean ports of Málaga and Almería.

During this time, Ferdinand refrained from directly attacking Jaén choosing rather to consolidate his hold over the Guadalquivir valley by dismantling and eliminating the network of Muslim outposts supporting the fortress. The end of Ferdinand's previous siege of Jaén in 1230 coincided with the death of his father, King Alfonso IX of León and for a period of over two years immediately thereafter, Ferdinand did not personally campaign as he remained in León dealing with succession issues and the integration of his newly enlarged domain. While at court in 1231, however, Ferdinand sent Archbishop Rodrigo Jiménez de Rada to capture Quesada, Cazorla, and the neighboring territories near the source of the Guadalquivir River. Later that year, Ferdinand sent Álvaro Pérez de Castro on a raid deep into southwest Al-Andalus where he defeated the forces of Ibn Hūd's at the Battle of Jerez.

In 1233, Ferdinand returned to the field and campaigned in the upper Guadalquivir River Valley. By 1245, Ferdinand had taken control of Arjona, Córdoba, Mengíbar, Murcia, Pegalajar and Ubeda. By the time of the initiation of the third siege of Jaén in 1245, the city had become an isolated outpost on the northern edge of Muḥammad I's Nasrid state with Ferdinand's forces controlling virtually every northern approach. Fifteen years of territorial conquest by Ferdinand had transformed Jaén from a formidable Muslim stronghold embedded within a broader Muslim strategic environment into an isolated Nasrid fortress that Muḥammad I could no longer reliably supply or relieve.

In 1245, with Jaén now more vulnerable, Ferdinand chose to make a third attempt to capture the city. Ferdinand was supported in the new campaign by Pelayo Pérez Correa, and the Grand Masters of the Order of Santiago.

Even as an isolated outpost, the conquest of the fortified city of Jaén remained a considerable task, as the city was built on the slopes of a prominent hill, the Cerro de Santa Catalina, and was enclosed by long curtain walls that descended from a fortified citadel, ran around the inhabited area, then climbed back toward the summit. The wall contained several towers, fortified gates, and defensive works.

== Siege ==
In August 1245, Ferdinand ordered that a bastida or fortified siege camp, be established outside of Jaén and arranged for his allies to take turns maintaining the site continuously until the city was taken. Ferdinand's objective was to restrict the movement of materials and supplies into the city. In the months that followed, Ferdinand effectively reduced the flow of grain, produce, live stock, and processed foods into Jaén. There is no evidence that Ferdinand conducted a sustained bombardment of the city walls, the urban area, or the citadel nor is there evidence that his army stormed the city walls or gates. In one small incident, the Crónica de la población de Ávila records an action outside the "Cemetery Gate" in which Castilian troops drove the Muslim defenders from their outer defensive works.

Within the confines of the city, the Muslims maintained their defensive positions and initiated fighting outside the city walls by means of sorties. The Crónica de la población de Ávila describes a Muslim sortie conducted outside the city’s walls on the road toward the settlement of Castro to the south of Jaén. In this action, the Muslims seized a string of pack animals belonging to Álvar Gil de Villalobos, a Castilian-Leonese nobleman serving in Ferdinand's army. The small Muslim force then withdrew in a manner intended to draw the Christian escort into an ambush. Seventeen Christian knights were eventually confronted by a large contingent of Muslim horsemen. Quickly, the Christian knights disengaged and fled back to safety. In all such confrontations, neither side achieved a decisive tactical victory.

The siege continued throughout the fall and into the winter causing the quantities of food stocks and materials to decrease significantly. By late February, conditions within the city deteriorated further and Muḥammad realized that his position was untenable. He recognized that Ferdinand intended to continue the siege until the city fell. He knew that he could not relieve the city and that the populace was approaching starvation. Seeking to protect the remainder of his Nasrid state, Muhammad I approached Ferdinand and negotiated an agreement known today as the Pact of Jaén.

It is believed that the negotiated transfer of the city took place sometime between 25 and 28 February. On 28 February, Ferdinand began to issues orders with respect to the disposition of captured property. It is further believed that Ferdinand's formal entry into the city may not have occurred until 1 March or shortly thereafter. The Muslim population was allowed to peaceably leave the city.

== Aftermath ==
With respect to the terms of the Pact of Jaén, Castilian sources believed that Muḥammad subordinated himself to Ferdinand and agreed to an annual tribute in exchange for the recognition of the Emirate of Granada; Arabic sources characterize the agreement as a twenty-year peace treaty by which Jaén and its dependent fortresses were ceded to Ferdinand.

The pact and the surrender of Jaén ultimately provided Ferdinand with several strategic advantages. The upper Guadalquivir River Valley was secured and the relationship with the Emirate of Granada further to the south was stabilized. Muhammad I was removed at least temporarily as Ferdinand's enemy. Under the Castilian interpretation of the relationship, Muḥammad I was obligated to provide Ferdinand with military assistance. As such, the relationship allowed Ferdinand the freedom to redirect his military offensives westward and concentrate on the conquest of Seville. And finally, as protection in the event that the relationship with Muhammad I fell apart, Ferdinand possessed the powerful Jaén fortress on his southern border to guard against an invasion by Granada.

The pact also provided tangible benefits for Muhammad I. Although the Jaén fortress was lost, the Muslim state of Granada was formally recognized by Ferdinand. In addition, the peace agreement negotiated provided Muhammad I a period of time lasting nearly two decades, during which he consolidated and strengthened the Emirate of Granada. In fact, modern scholarship has at times described the Pact of Jaén as effectively marking the political consolidation or "birth certificate" of the Emirate of Granada.

== See also ==
- Jaén, Spain
- List of Castilian Battles
