= Ferdinand of León =

Ferdinand of León may refer to:

- Ferdinand I of León and Castile (died 1056), king
- Ferdinand II of León (died 1188), king
- Ferdinand of León (died 1214), infante

== See also ==
- Ferdinand of Castile (disambiguation)
