= Escuela Politécnica Superior de Linares =

School of the University of Jaén

Higher Polytechnic School of Linares
- Escuela Politécnica Superior de Linares
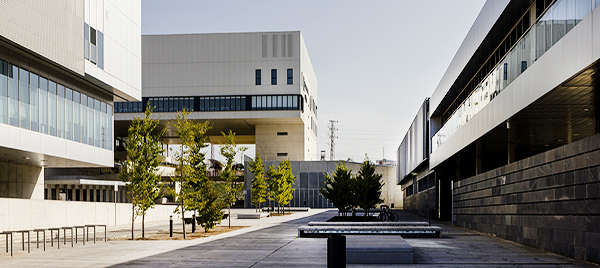
- Motto: Una apuesta de futuro (A bet for the future)
- Type: Public, Univ. of Applied Sciences
- Established: 1976
- President: Manuel Valverde Ibáñez
- Location: Linares, Andalusia, Spain
- Website: https://epsl.ujaen.es/

The Higher Polytechnic School of Linares (Spanish: Escuela Politécnica Superior de Linares, often abbreviated as EPS Linares) is an engineering school belonging to the University of Jaén since July 1, 1993. It is located in the city of Linares, Spain. This school was born as a result of the merger of the University Schools of Industrial Engineering and Mining Engineering, existing in Linares until 1976. Both schools were dedicated to the training of professionals in the fields of Mining Engineering (since 1892), Industrial Engineering (since 1910) and Telecommunications Engineering (since 1993).

The current facilities at the Polytechnic School are located, from September 1, 2015, in the Science and Technology Campus of Linares. Until that date, they had been located in two buildings dating from 1949 in Alfonso X "The Wise" street, where it was popularly known as La Escuela de Peritos (The School of Experts).

== Current training offer ==
The EPS Linares currently offers 8 bachelor's degrees, 4 dual bachelor's degrees and 5 master's degrees. The academic offer is essentially focused on the field of engineering, where this institution is a national benchmark. The engineering degrees taught at the EPS Linares are grouped into three large branches or families (industrial, civil-mining and telecommunications). All the engineering degrees of the Linares EPS lead to regulated professions with recognized professional attributions throughout the Spanish territory, in accordance with Law 12/1986 (BOE no. 79/02-04-1986). In addition, the bachelor's and master's degrees taught at the Linares EPS are accredited with the distinctive international quality seal EUR-ACE label (European Accredited Engineer), granted by the National Agency for Quality Assessment and Accreditation (ANECA) in collaboration with the Spanish Institute of Engineering.

=== Undergraduate programs ===
==== Civil-mining engineering branch ====
- Degree in Civil Engineering, with the option of the international double degree in civil engineering between the EPS Linares and the Leipzig University of Applied Sciences (Saxony, Germany)
- Degree in Mining Technology Engineering, minors in Mining Exploitation, Drilling and Mining Prospecting
- Degree in Energy Resources Engineering

==== Industrial engineering branch ====
- Degree in Mechanical Engineering, with the option of a double international degree in mechanical engineering between the EPS Linares and the University of Applied Sciences Schmalkalden (Thuringia, Germany)
- Degree in Electrical Engineering
- Degree in Industrial Chemical Engineering

==== Telecommunications engineering branch ====
- Degree in Telecommunication Technology Engineering, minors in Telecommunication and Sound and Image Systems
- Degree in Telematics Engineering

=== Postgraduate programs ===
- Master's Degree in Telecommunication Engineering, with the option of the international double master's degree in Telecommunication Engineering between the EPS Linares and the University of Applied Sciences Mittelhessen (Hesse, Germany)
- Master's Degree in Mining Engineering
- Master's Degree in Land Transportation Engineering and Logistics
- Master's Degree in Connected Industry
- Master's Degree in Materials Engineering and Sustainable Construction

=== PhD programs ===
The EPS Linares offers the PhD program in advances in materials engineering and sustainable energy.

== See also ==
- University of Jaén
- Linares

== Sources ==
- Lupiáñez Cruz, Patricio (2002). Historia y antecedentes de la Escuela Universitaria Politécnica de Linares (PDF) (in Spanish). Geological and Mining Institute of Spain. ISBN 84-7840-472-4.
