= Castle of Santa Catalina (Jaén) =

Cultural property in Jaén, Spain

Coordinates: 37°46′02″N 3°47′58″W

Saint Catherine's Castle
- Castillo de Santa Catalina
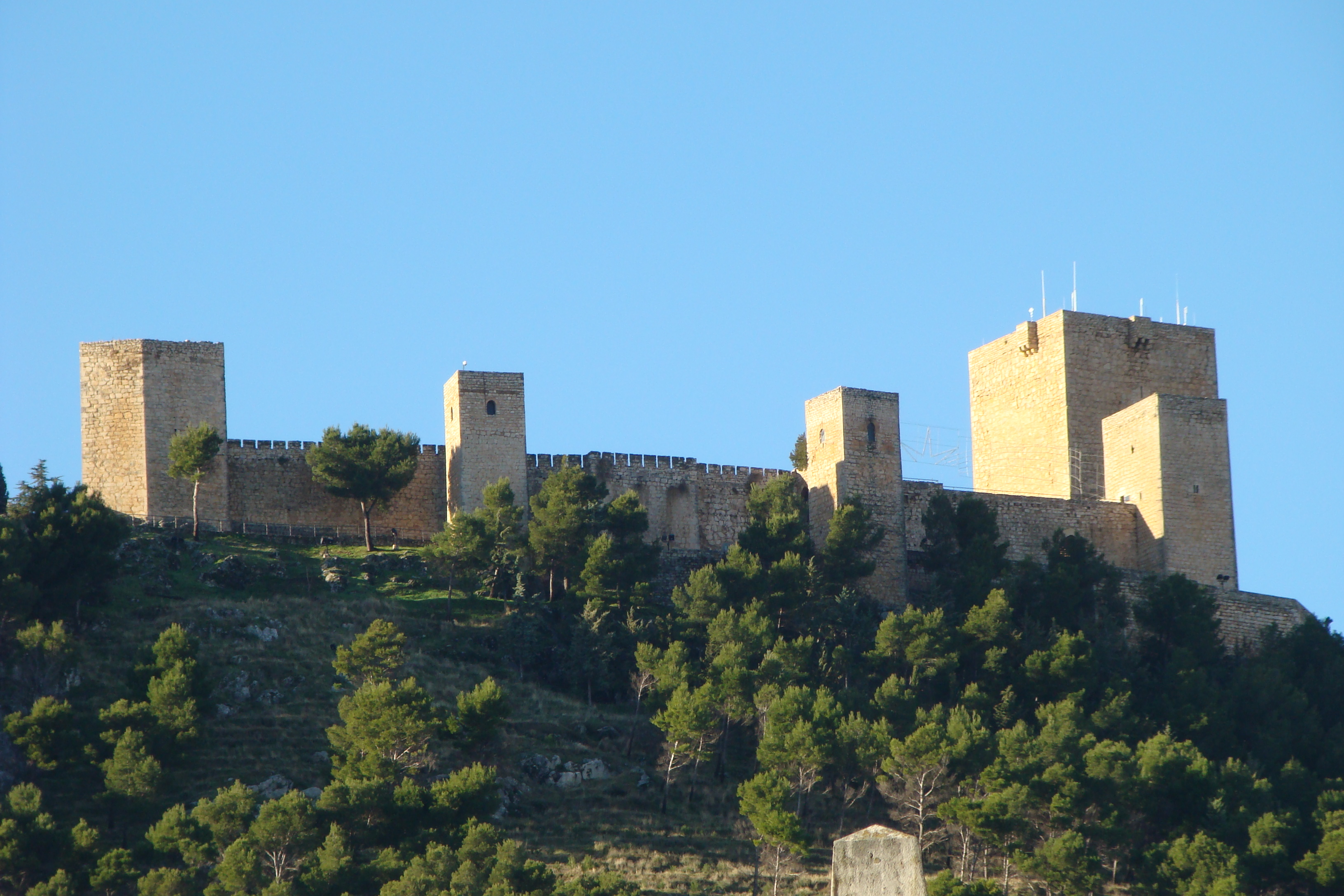
- Saint Catherine's Castle
- Interactive map of the Saint Catherine's Castle area
- Alternative names: Parador de Jaén
- Hotel chain: Paradores

General information
- Architectural style: Medieval
- Location: Jaén, Spain
- Construction started: 13-15th century

Website
- Parador de Jaén

Spanish Cultural Heritage
- Type: Non-movable
- Criteria: Monument
- Designated: 3 June 1931
- Reference no.: RI-51-0000646

Saint Catherine's Castle (Spanish: Castillo de Santa Catalina) is a castle that sits on the Cerro de Santa Catalina overlooking the Spanish city of Jaén. It is now the site of a parador designed by José Luis Picardo.

== History ==
The castle began as a Moorish fortress built by the Umayyads in the 8th century, later improved by the Nasrid ruler of the Emirate of Granada, Abdallah ibn al-Ahmar (who also built the Alhambra). Earlier, where the parador now stands, there was a tower known as Hannibal's Tower, of which some traces remain. During this period Jayyan (Jaén) was an important stopping place for caravans headed to Madrid and it is possible that the castle was used to house travelling parties.

After King Ferdinand III of Castile captured the city in 1246 after the Siege of Jaén, he commenced a transformation of the castle, including construction of what became known as the New Castle on the eastern extreme of the hill. The bulk of the work, however, took place under the reigns of Alfonso X and Ferdinand IV.

There are five towers and a donjon, with one of the towers holding the Chapel of Saint Catherine. One of the last structures built during this period was the donjon, which was the work of the Constable of Castile, Miguel Lucas de Iranzo. The builders of the new castle used some of the towers and ramparts of the old fortress, and destroyed or replaced others. The construction in 1965 of the parador resulted in destruction of many of the elements of the Old Castle. The few remnants of the original fortress occupy the western extreme of the hill.

The 17th century saw some interior remodeling of the buildings. Then in the early 19th century, Napoleonic forces built a gunpowder store, stables, hospital, offices, kitchen, and artillery platform. Little beyond the foundations remains of most of these.

On the top of the hill there is a monumental cross that recalls the cross that Ferdinand III had erected there. At the foot of the cross, engraved in the rock, is the "Sonnet to the Cross" by the poet Almendros Aguilar.

The castle and parador have a view over the valley of the Guadalquivir to the ridges of the Sierra Morena. General Charles de Gaulle stayed in the parador while writing his memoirs.

By 1983 it housed an 80-bed hotel. The castle was named for the patron saint of Jaén.
