= List of battles involving Castile =

This is a list of battles involving the Kingdom of Castile, organized by date.

== 13th century ==
- 1212 - Battle of Las Navas de Tolosa - Perhaps most famous battle of the Reconquista, fought between the Almohad Caliphate commanded by Muhammad al-Nasir and the Catholic kingdoms (Castile, Crown of Aragon, Kingdom of Portugal, Kingdom of Navarre, Kingdom of France, Kingdom of León), Christian victory.
- 1225 - Siege of Jaén - Siege of the town of Jaén controlled by the Tarifa of Jayyān by the Kingdom of Castile under Ferdinand III of Castile. Muslim forces were commanded by the Christian, Álvaro Pérez de Castro el Castellano, Castilian victory.
- 1230 - Siege of Jaén - Siege of the town of Jaén controlled by the Tarifa of Jayyān by the Kingdom of Castile under Ferdinand III of Castile. Castilian forces called off the siege upon the death of Ferdinand's father, Alfonso IX of León, draw.
- 1231 - Battle of Jerez - Fought between the Kingdom of Castile under Ferdinand III of Castile and Ibn Hud, King of the Taifa of Murcia, Castilian-Leonese victory.
- 1245-46 - Siege of Jaén - Siege of the town of Jaén controlled by the Emirate of Granada by the Kingdom of Castile under Ferdinand III of Castile and Paio Peres Correia, master of the Order of Santiago, Castilian victory.
- 1278 - Battle of Algeciras - Naval battle between the combined fleets of the Marinid dynasty and the Emirate of Granada under Abu Yaqub Yusuf an-Nasr against that of Castile under Pedro Martínez de Fe, Marinid victory.
- 1278 - Siege of Algeciras - Siege of Algeciras by the Kingdom of Castile and the Order of Santa María de España, disastrous defeat for Castile.
- 1284 - Siege of Albarracín - In an effort to eliminate political rivals supporting the claims of the Infantes de la Cerda to the Castilian throne, Castile agreed with Peter III of Aragon to eliminate the renegade Juan Núñez I de Lara, Aragonese victory.

== 14th century ==
- 1309 - Siege of Algeciras - Castilian forces under Ferdinand IV of Castile take the Muslim stronghold of Algeciras from the Emirate of Granada under Abu'l-Juyush Nasr and Muhammad III, Castilian victory.
- 1319 - Battle of La Vega de Granada - Battle fought between the Kingdom of Castile and the Emirate of Granada, Granadan victory.
- 1330 - Battle of Teba - Battle fought between the Kingdom of Castile under Alfonso XI of Castile and the Emirate of Granada under Muhammad IV, Castilian victory.
- 1336 - Battle of Villanueva de Barcarrota - Fought between the Kingdom of Castile and the Kingdom of Portugal, Castilian victory.
- 1342-44 - Siege of Algeciras - Decisive victory for the forces of Alfonso XI of Castile against the Kingdom of Fez and Emirate of Granada under Abu al-Hasan Ali ibn Othman and Yusuf, Castilian victory.
- 1359 - Battle of Araviana - Battle between Castile, commanded by Juan Fernández de Henestrosa who was killed in the battle, and the Kingdom of Aragon, allied with the House of Trastámara and the exiled Castilian nobles commanded by Henry of Trastámara, Aragonese victory.
- 21 December 1361 - Battle of Linuesa - Battle fought between Castile, with its allies, the Kingdom of Jaén and the Kingdom of Granada. Castilian forces commanded by Diego García de Padilla and Granada by Muhammed II of Granada, Castilian victory.
- 15 January 1362 - Battle of Guadix - Battle between the Kingdom of Granada and Castile. Granadan victory.
- 3 April 1367 - Battle of Nájera - Battle fought between the supporters of Henry II of Castile, together with his ally, the Kingdom of France, against the supporters of Peter of Castile and his allies; Gascony, Kingdom of England, the Duchy of Aquitaine, and the Kingdom of Mallorca, victory for Peter of Castile.
- 14 March 1369 - Battle of Montiel - Battle fought between the forces of Peter of Castile, together with its ally the Kingdom of Granada, against the Kingdom of France and the forces of Henry II of Castile, Franco-Castilian victory.
- 1369 - Siege of Algeciras - Siege of the Castilian controlled fortress of Algeciras by the forces of the Emirate of Granada under Muhammed V, Granadan victory.
- 1372 - Battle of La Rochelle - Battle fought between the Kingdom of Castile supported by the Kingdom of France commanded by Ambrosio Boccanegra against the Kingdom of England commanded by John Hastings, the Earl of Pembroke, Castilian victory.
- 1385 - Battle of Aljubarrota - Battle fought between the Kingdom of Portugal, allied with the Kingdom of England against Castile which was allied with the Kingdom of France and the Kingdom of Aragon, Portuguese victory.

== 15th century ==
- 1406 - Battle of Collejares - Battle fought between the Kingdom of Castile, under Henry III of Castile and the Kingdom of Granada under Muhammed VII, Castilian victory.
- 1407 - Battle of Gibraltar - Naval battle fought between Castile, under Juan Enríquez, Bishop of Lugo and the Kingdom of Granada, Castilian-Leonese victory.
- 1431 - Battle of La Higueruela - Battle fought between Castile and the Nasrid Dynasty, commanded by Muhammed IX, Castilian victory.
- 1452 - Battle of Los Alporchones - Battle fought between Castile, allied with the Kingdom of Murcia, commanded by Alonso Fajardo el Bravo and the Emirate of Granada under Malik ibn al-Abbas, Castilian victory.
- 1 March 1476 - Battle of Toro - Battle fought between the Castilians Juanistas, supported by Portugal and the Castilians Isabelistas, supported by the Kingdom of Aragon, inconclusive with both sides claiming victory.

== 16th century ==
- 1521–24- Siege of Fuenterrabía - Battle fought between the Kingdom of Castile and Aragon against the Kingdoms of France and Navarre, Castilian victory.
- 1580- Battle of Alcântara (1580) -Battle fought between the Kingdoms of Castile and Aragon against the Kingdom of Portugal, that ended with the annexation of Portugal by Philip II of Spain.

== See also ==
- Reconquista
- Kingdom of Castile
- War of the Castilian Succession

=== External links ===
- Domingo, Paco "". CRONOLOGIA DE LAS BATALLAS MAS RELEVANTES EN LA HISTORIA DE ESPAÑA (In Spanish).
