= Juan Eslava Galán =

Spanish writer

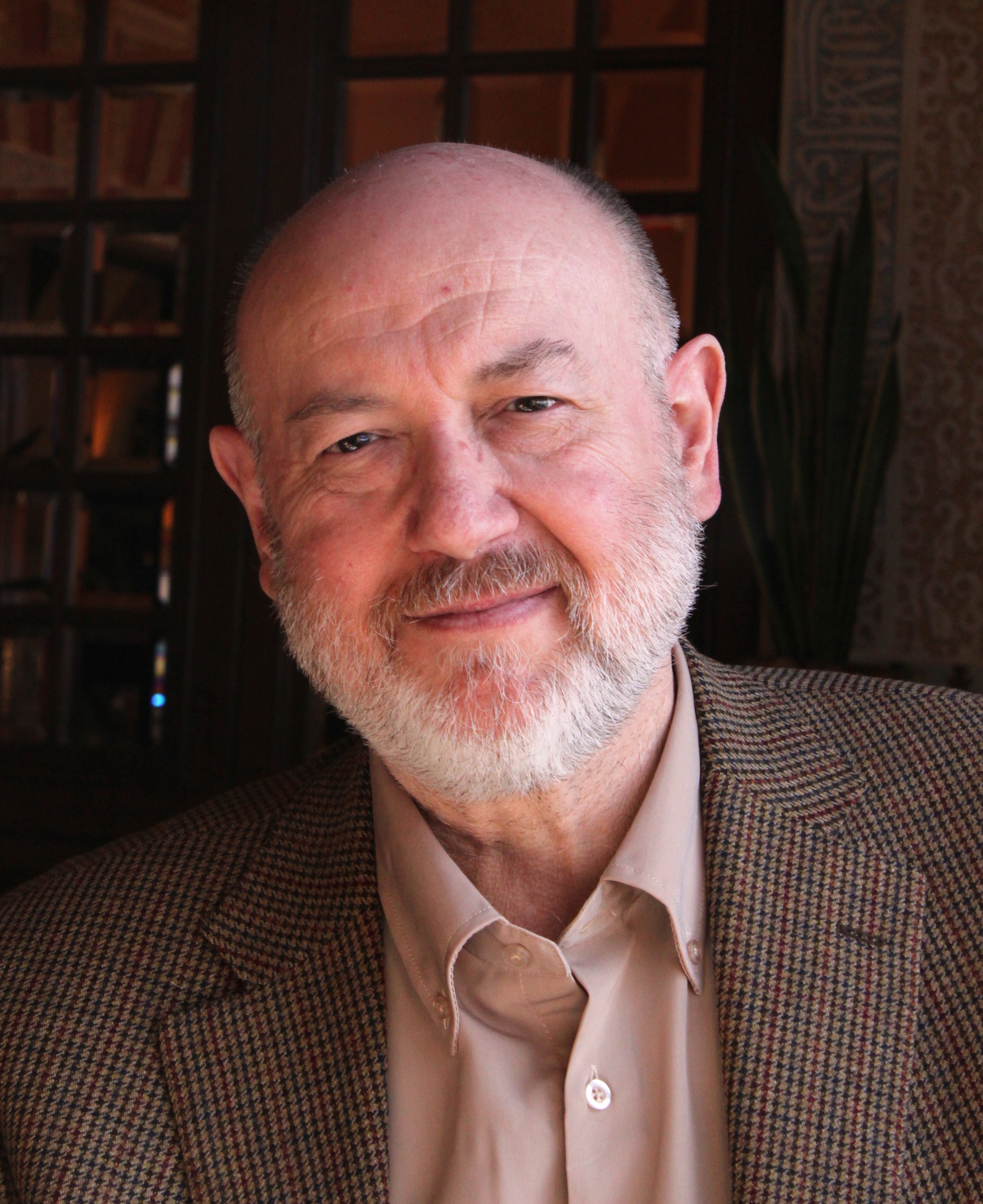
- Born: 7 March 1948 (age 78); Arjona, Jaén, Spain
- Occupations: Novelist, professor
- Writing career
- Pen name: Nicholas Wilcox
- Period: Subce 1975
- Genres: Historic novel, essay, fantasy, mystery
- Notable awards: Premio Planeta 1987; En busca del unicornio
- Website: www.juaneslavagalan.com

Juan Eslava Galán (born 7 March 1948), is a Spanish writer of historic genre, both fiction and non-fiction. He has published some of his works under the pen name Nicholas Wilcox.

In 2012 he published Las ciudades de la Bética, an essay by Fundación José Manuel Lara; Historia del mundo contada para escépticos, other essay by Editorial Planeta; and Últimas pasiones del caballero Almafiera, a novel by Editorial Planeta.

== Prizes ==
- Premio Planeta 1987 for En busca del unicornio
- Premio Chianti Ruffino – Antico Fattore 1988 for En busca del unicornio translated into Italian
- Premio Fernando Lara 1998 for Señorita
- Premio de la Crítica Andaluza 1998 for Señorita
- Premio Ateneo de Sevilla 1994 for El comedido hidalgo
- Premio Primavera de Novela (2015) for Misterioso asesinato en casa de Cervantes.

== Works ==
- La reconquista contada para escépticos, 2022
- La conquista de América contada para escépticos, 2019
- Misterioso asesinato en casa de Cervantes, Espasa, 2015
- Últimas pasiones del caballero Almafiera, novela, Planeta, 2012
- La década que nos dejó sin aliento, Planeta, 2011
- Templarios, griales, vírgenes negras y otros enigmas de la Historia, Planeta, 2011
- Homo erectus, Planeta, 2011
- Rey lobo, 2010
- De la alpargata al seiscientos, Planeta, 2010
- El catolicismo explicado a las ovejas, 2009
- 1000 sitios que ver en España al menos una vez en la vida, 2009
- Califas, guerreros, esclavas y eunucos. Los moros en España, 2008
- Los años del miedo, 2008
- La lápida templaria descifrada, 2008
- El mercenario de Granada, 2006
- España insólita y misteriosa, 2006
- Viaje a los escenarios del capitán Alatriste, 2006
- Viaje a la costa de las ballenas, 2006
- Una historia de la guerra civil que no va a gustar a nadie, 2005
- Sonetos (2005)
- El paraíso disputado. Ruta de los castillos y las batallas, ensayo, Guías Aguilar, 2003
- Los íberos. Los españoles como fuimos, 2004
- Los Reyes Católicos, 2004
- La mula, novela, 2003
- La muerte de la abuela, novela, 2003
- Santos y pecadores. Álbum de recuerdos de los españolitos del siglo XX, ensayo, Planeta, 2002
- Un jardín entre olivos (Las rutas del olivo en España. Masaru en el Olivar III), ensayo, 2002
- Las rutas del olivo en Andalucía (Masaru en el Olivar II), 2001
- Los dientes del Dragón, 2001
- Los castillos de Jaén, ensayo, Universidad de Jaén, 1999
- Las rutas del olivo en Jaén (Masaru en el Olivar I), 1999
- Otro Jaén (1999)
- Escuela y prisiones de Vicentito González, 1999
- Señorita, 1998
- Tumbaollas y hambrientos. Los españoles comiendo y ayunando a través de la historia, 1997
- El fraude de la Sábana Santa y las reliquias de Cristo, 1997
- La España del 98. El fin de una era, 1997
- Amor y sexo en la antigua Grecia, 1997
- La España de las libertades, 1997
- Coitus interreptus, 1997
- La vida amorosa en Roma, 1996
- La vida y la época de los Reyes Católicos, 1996
- Julio César, el hombre que pudo reinar, 1995
- Historia de España contada para escépticos, ensayo, 1995 (he later published updated editions)
- Statio Orbis (El magno evento), 1995
- El comedido hidalgo, 1994
- El sexo de nuestros padres, 1993
- Cleopatra, la serpiente del Nilo, 1993
- Los templarios y otros enigmas medievales, ensayo, 1992
- Historias de la Inquisición, 1992
- Historia secreta del sexo en España, 1992
- El enigma de Colón y los descubrimientos de América, 1992
- El viaje de Tobías, 1992
- Tartessos y otros enigmas de la historia, 1991
- Grandes batallas de la historia de España, 1990
- Verdugos y torturadores, 1990
- Guadalquivir, 1990
- El Mercedes del Obispo y otros relatos edificantes, 1990
- Cuentos crueles, 1990
- Tu magistral amor, 1990
- Castillos y murallas del Reino de Jaén, 1989
- Yo, Nerón, 1989
- Catedral, 1989
- Roma de los césares, 1988
- Yo, Aníbal, 1988
- El enigma de la Mesa de Salomón, 1987
- En busca del unicornio, 1987
- Cinco tratados españoles de alquimia, 1986
- Leyendas de los castillos de Jaén, 1982
- La leyenda del Lagarto de la Malena y los mitos del dragón, 1981
- Friary Grange School. Estudio de una comprehensive school inglesa, 1978
- Jofra, 1975

=== Novels as Nicholas Wilcox ===
- Los templarios y la Mesa de Salomón, 2004
- Las trompetas de Jericó, 2002
- La sangre de Dios, 2002
- Los falsos peregrinos, 2000
- La lápida templaria, 1996
