= Simon F. Barton =

British historian and medievalist

Simon Fraser Barton (1962–2017) was a British historian who specialised in medieval Iberian history.

Educated in Wales, Barton graduated from the University of Aberystwyth in 1983 with a degree in History. In York, he started his postgraduate studies supervised by Richard A. Fletcher. Simon's core research centred on the lay aristocracy of twelfth-century León-Castile. While at the University of Cambridge, his research would lead to his first monograph, The Aristocracy in Twelfth-Century León and Castile, published in 1997.

Simon relocated to the University of Exeter in 1993, where he joined the department of Hispanic studies until being appointed a professor there in 2006. He spent about 22 years at the University of Exeter. The World of El Cid (2000), which he co-edited with Richard A. Fletcher, and his "best-seller" A History of Medieval Spain (2004, reprinted in 2009), on which Barton had just begun work on a new revised and enhanced edition, were among the publications that were produced during this time, along with his research and growing number of publications. He actively participated in a sizable number of administrative and academic tasks, such as leading Exeter University's Centre for Medieval Studies. He also served as the department's director of education for three years before taking over as head.

Simon's intellectual curiosity and capacity to broaden his field of study to encompass issues and methodological stances that went beyond his initial training are reflected in his research trajectory. Conquerors, Brides, and Concubines: Interfaith Relations and Social Power in Medieval Iberia, his most recent work, is a good example. In a process he described as "getting a second Ph.D.," Simon expanded on his initial focus on the lay aristocracy and looked at the cultural, political, and social effects and roles that interfaith marital alliances and sexual encounters played in the complex dynamics of Medieval Iberia.

== Sources ==
- Scorpo, Antonella Liuzzo; Wagner, Esther-Miriam; Heath, Christopher; Williams, Alun (2018). "Obituary". Al-Masāq: Journal of the Medieval Mediterranean. 30 (1: Hair in the mediaeval Muslim world). Taylor & Francis: 1–3.
