= University of Jaén =

Public university in Jaén, Andalucía, Spain

- Universidad de Jaén
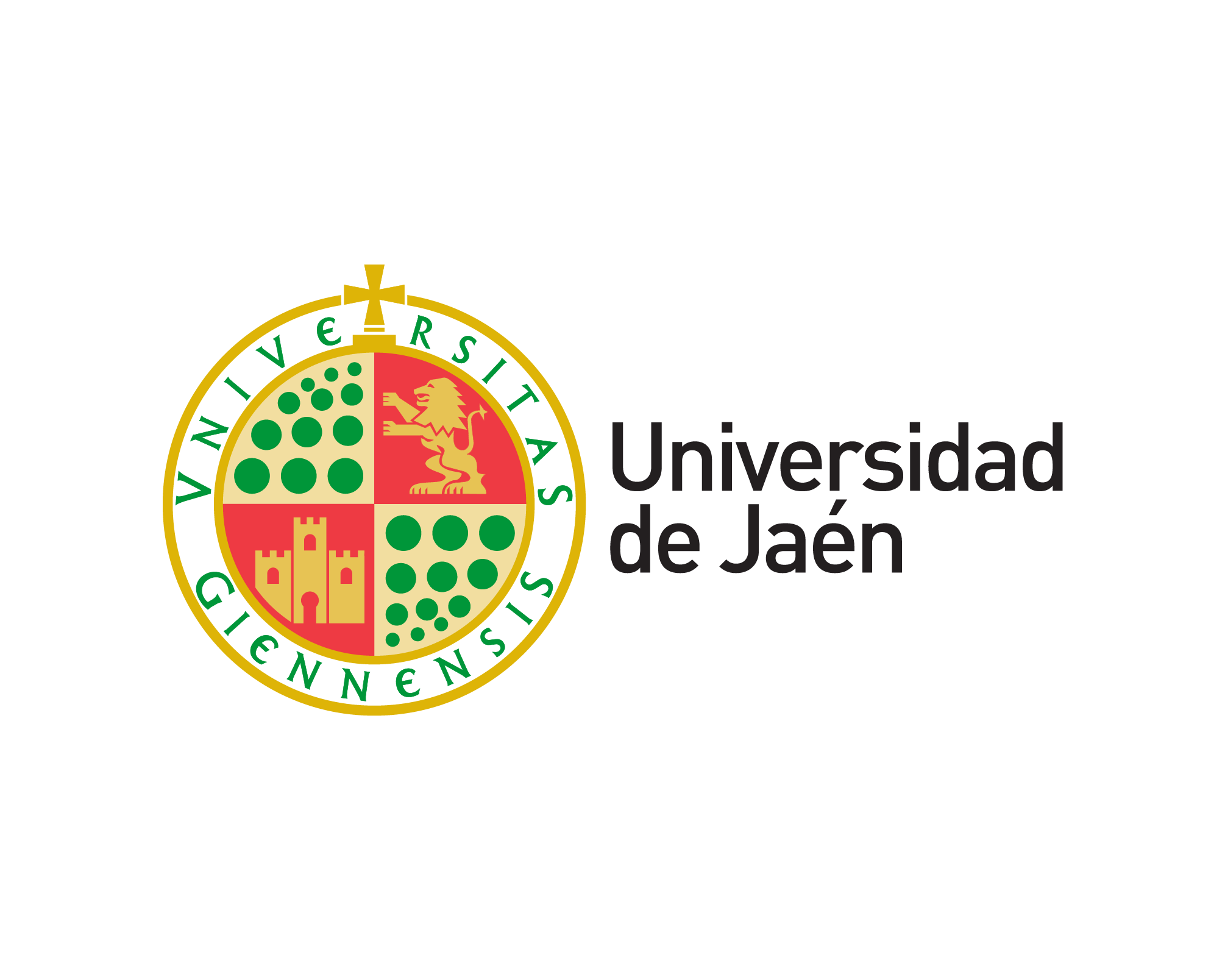
- Motto: Universitas Giennensis
- Type: Public
- Established: 1993
- Budget: EUR 132.895 million (2021)
- Rector: Nicolás Ruiz Reyes
- Academic staff: 972
- Administrative staff: 927
- Students: 16,990
- Address: Campus Las Lagunillas, Ctra. Torrequebradilla s/n, Jaén, Linares and Úbeda, Andalusia, Spain
- Campus: Main campuses in Jaén and Linares. Other smaller facilities in the city of Úbeda.
- Colors: Green, Gold, Red
- Website: http://www.ujaen.es
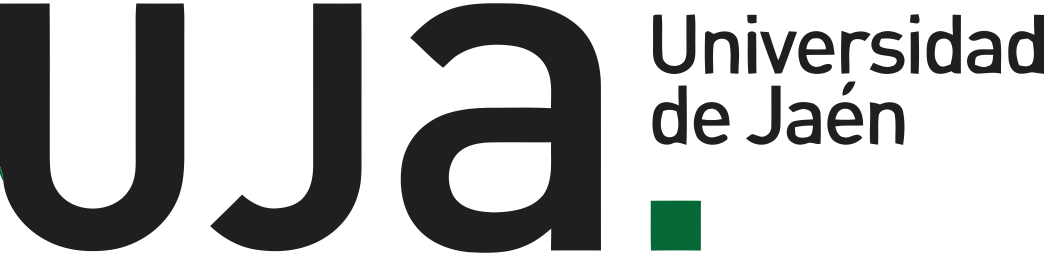

University rankings

Global – Overall
- ARWU World: 801–900 (2023)
- THE World: 801–1000 (2024)
- USNWR Global: =1147 (2023)

The University of Jaén (Spanish: UJA; Universidad de Jaén; Latin: Universitas Giennensis) is a public research university based in Jaén, Andalucía, Spain.

The University has two campuses: Las Lagunillas, located in Jaén and the Scientific-Technological Campus of Linares. Another affiliated center is located in Úbeda.

== History ==
In 1982 the college joined the University of Granada.

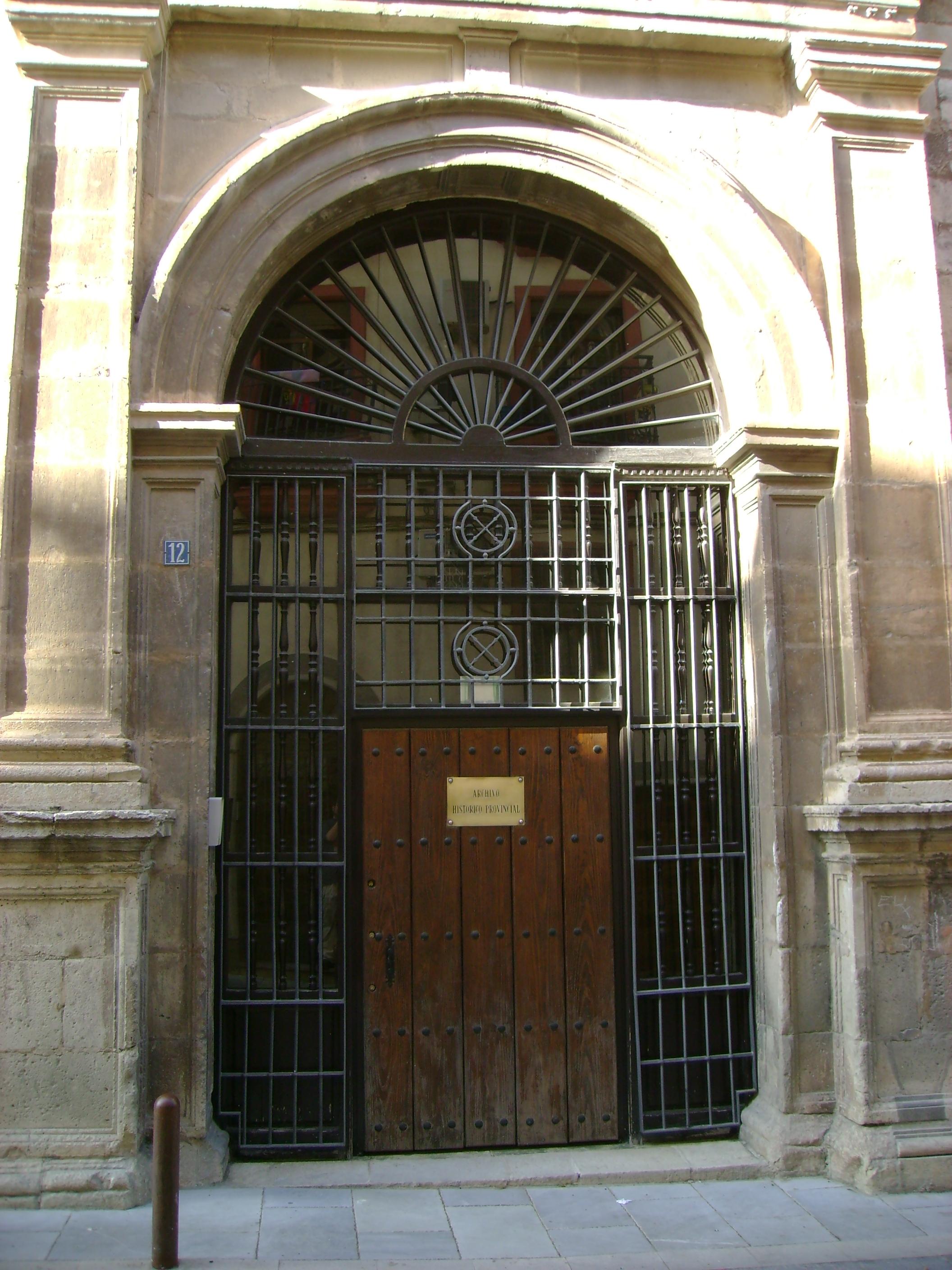
Gateway to the Royal Convent of Santo Domingo, former university.

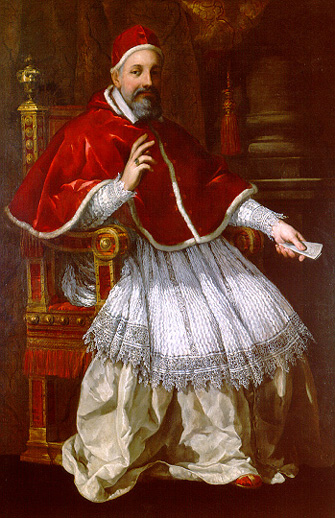
Pope Urban VIII.

=== Future prospects ===
The University of Jaén is at its peak of development and on the point of changing, adapting and renovating to provide better quality teaching. Another project is the improvement of public transport to the campus.

- Animal Research Center or Animal Facility, behind the library, which will serve for testing and research with animals.
- Building department for the Faculty of Humanities and Education, built on the site of the old school Candido Nogales. Remodelling of the existing departmental building of Humanities (D-2).
- Research Center, next to the former building, which will host the Andalusian Center for Iberian Archaeology.
- A complete renovation of the auditorium, located in Building C-1, and the reunification of the secretariats of the various faculties into one area in Building B-5 has also been undertaken.
- Building for research support, innovation and employment, alongside the Animal Research Centre, where an office of the CADE (Andalusian Centre for Entrepreneurs) Office will be placed.
