= Ferdinand of Castile =

Ferdinand of Castile may refer to:

- Fernando Ansúrez I (died 929), count
- Fernán González of Castile (died 970), count
- Ferdinand I of León and Castile (died 1065), king
- Ferdinand of Castile (died 1211), infante
- Ferdinand III of Castile (died 1252), king
- Ferdinand of Castile (born 1238), infante
- Ferdinand de la Cerda (died 1275), infante
- Ferdinand IV of Castile (died 1312), king
- Ferdinand II of Aragon and V of Castile (died 1516), king
