= Taifa of Baeza =

Medieval Islamic taifa kingdom

Coordinates: 37°59′N 3°28′W

- 1224–1226
- Capital: Baeza
- Common languages: Arabic, Mozarabic, Hebrew
- Religion: Islam, Christianity (Roman Catholicism), Judaism
- Government: Monarchy
- Historical era: Middle Ages
  - Established: 1224
  - Conquered by Castile: 1226
- Currency: Dirham and Dinar
| Preceded by | Succeeded by |
| Almohad dynasty | Kingdom of Castile |

The Taifa of Baeza (Arabic: طائفة بياسة) was a medieval taifa Moorish kingdom. It existed only from 1224 to 1226, when it fell to the Christian Kingdom of Castile.

== List of Emirs ==
=== Bayasid dynasty ===
- 'Abd Allah al-Bayasi "El Baezano": 1224–1226
