= Abu Said Faraj =

Granadan prince

Governor of Málaga
- In office: 1279 – early 1310s
- Predecessor: Umar ibn Mahalli (for the Marinid Sultanate)
- Successor: Ismail ibn Faraj
- Born: 1248
- Died: 24 April 1320 (aged 71–72); Salobreña, Emirate of Granada
- Spouse: Fatima
- Issue: Ismail I, Muhammad
Names
- أبو سعيد فرج بن إسماعيل ʾAbū Saʿīd Faraj ibn ʾIsmāʿīl
- Dynasty: Nasrid dynasty
- Father: Ismail ibn Nasr

Abu Said Faraj ibn Ismail (أبو سعيد فرج بن إسماعيل, 1248 – 24 April 1320) was a member of the Nasrid dynasty of Granada, who was a close advisor to Sultan Muhammad II (r. 1273–1302) and Muhammad III (r. 1302–1309) and served as the governor of Málaga between 1279 and the early 1310s. He was born in 1248 to Ismail ibn Nasr, governor of Málaga and brother of Sultan Muhammad I. After Ismail's death, the Sultan brought the young Abu Said to court, where he became friends with his cousin, the future Muhammad II. When the latter became Sultan, Abu Said became his advisor on economic and military policies. He married Muhammad II's daughter Fatima, and in 1279 he was appointed as the royal governor in Málaga. The city—the realm's most important port—had just recently been recovered by the crown after a rebellion by the Banu Ashqilula since 1266 followed by a short occupation by the Marinids of Morocco since 1278. He implemented policies to pacify the population and improved the region's economic condition, as well as embarking on the construction of ships to strengthen the Granadan navy. As governor, he also led Málaga's troops in various campaigns on the Iberian Peninsula, including against rebels and against the Marinid Sultanate.

He remained governor under the next Sultan, his brother-in-law Muhammad III, with whom he and his wife also enjoyed good relations. He led the Granadan campaign to conquer Ceuta in North Africa in 1306. His relations with the next Sultan, Nasr (r. 1309–1314), were poor and in 1311 he started a rebellion to enthrone his own son, Ismail, instead. His forces captured various castles and defeated the Sultan in battle, before being forced to return to Málaga after failing to besiege the capital. After this setback, he was deposed as governor of Málaga due to an attempt to yield the city to the Marinid Sultanate, and he was imprisoned by his son Ismail until his death in 1320. At some point after his imprisonment, Ismail restarted the rebellion and succeeded in taking the throne as Ismail I (r. 1314–1325).

== Early life ==
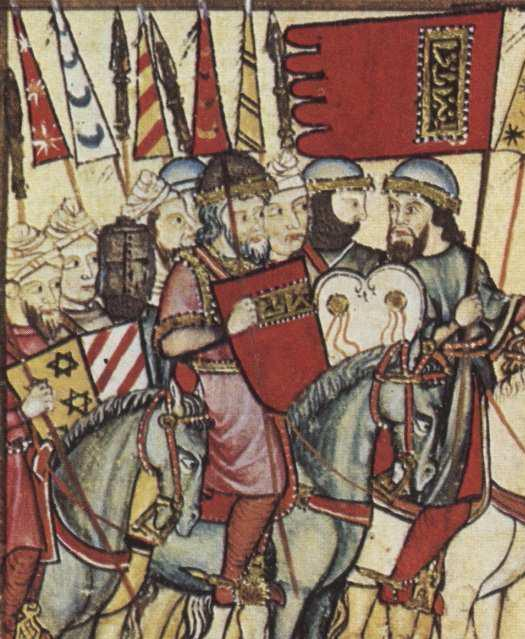
Muhammad I, Abu Said's uncle and the founder of the Emirate of Granada.

Abu Said Faraj was born in 1248, a son of Ismail ibn Nasr, brother of Muhammad, the founder of the Nasrid dynasty of Granada. The Sultan had appointed Ismail as governor of Málaga, a post that he held until his death in 1257. Upon Ismail's death, Muhammad brought his nine-year old nephew Abu Said to his court in Granada, and left Málaga under the governorship of Abu Muhammad ibn Ashqilula, a member of the Banu Ashqilula family—then allies of the Nasrids—who was also Muhammad's nephew.

== Life at court ==
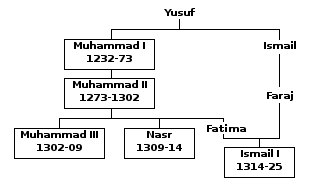
Selected members of the Nasrid dynasty up to Ismail I, including Abu Said Faraj. Sultans are depicted in boxes.

At court, Abu Said became friends with his cousin, the Sultan's son Muhammad (future Muhammad II, born c. 1235, r. 1273–1302). Meanwhile, Málaga became a centre of a rebellion by the Banu Ashqilula which started in 1266 and was to last for almost two decades. When Muhammad I died in 1273 and was replaced by Muhammad II, Abu Said became the new Sultan's trusted adviser. Despite his youth, he was known for his intelligence and provided counsel on economic and military matters. Abu Said was credited with the Sultan's decision to expand and consolidate the crown lands and to replace pastures with cultivated land. Further strengthening ties between the two cousins, Abu Said married Muhammad II's daughter Fatima. The anonymous work al-Dahira al-Saniyya dates Abu Said's marriage to the year 664 AH (1265/1266), but modern historian María Jesús Rubiera Mata doubts the accuracy of this date: Fatima (born 659 AH) would have been a child then; additionally, the text confuses the bride as Muhammad I's daughter (while Fatima was his granddaughter), and says that the groom was his cousin (Abu Said was Muhammad I's nephew). Rubiera Mata suggests that the real marriage date was closer to the birth of the couple's first child, Ismail, in 1279. In that year, the Nasrid dynasty finally regained Málaga from the Marinid Sultanate of Morocco—to whom the Banu Ashqilula rebels handed the city one year earlier— and Abu Said was appointed to his father's former post of its governor. He departed on 11 February 1279, while Fatima likely remained initially in the royal palace complex of Alhambra to give birth to Ismail, who was born on 3 March.

== Governor of Málaga ==
The Emirate of Granada in 1306

Málaga was the second largest city of the Emirate after the capital and its most important Mediterranean port, without which "Granada was no more than an isolated mountain-girt city", according to historian L. P. Harvey. As it had been reoccupied after a rebellion lasting more than a decade, governing the city posed a difficult challenge and Abu Said was likely chosen because of his administrative experience in addition to his father's previous tenure there. According to Rubiera Mata, Abu Said "would brilliantly overcome" these challenges. With his katib (secretary) Ibn Isa, he implemented policies—with both firmness and gentleness, according to the near-contemporary historian Ibn al-Khatib—which eventually won over the people of Málaga and improved economic conditions. He also became rich from the tax revenues of the region. He embarked on the project of constructing large ships in Málaga, to which Rubiera Mata attributes "the great power of the Nasrid fleet in the following years". He maintained high personal prestige due to his standing in the royal family as well as his administrative and military accomplishments, and began receiving dedications in works of literature. Ibn al-Khatib reported that he cared for his son Ismail, who enjoyed "the favour of his father" (ni'mat abihi). He also had a younger son, named Muhammad, whose birth date is unknown.

Nasrid governors not only enjoyed administrative power over their regions, but were also the commander of the regional army. Málaga's troops under Abu Said's command were instrumental in Muhammad II's war against the Marinid Sultanate and in returning various outposts of the Marinids on the Iberian Peninsula to Granadan rule. He conducted vital military campaigns, principally in the area near the Straits of Gibraltar, including Algeciras, Gibraltar, and Tarifa. In 1295–1296, he led an unsuccessful campaign to suppress a rebellion in Ronda. The rebellion finally ended when Abu Abdallah ibn al-Hakim, the katib of Muhammad II and a brother of the city's rebellious leader, was sent to negotiate.

Muhammad II died in 1302 and was succeeded by his son Muhammad III, Abu Said's brother-in law. According to near-contemporary historian Ibn Khaldun, Abu Said had the complete trust of the Sultan, who kept him as governor of Málaga throughout his reign. Abu Said was responsible for the 1306 conquest of Ceuta, on the North African shore, in the name of Muhammad III. Partly by the instigation of Abu Said's agents, the city had rebelled against their Marinid overlords in 1304 and was henceforth ruled by the Banu al-Azafi, a local noble family. However, on 12 May 1306 a Granadan fleet led by Abu Said arrived, was welcomed by local supporters and took over the city without a fight. The conquest of Ceuta gave Granada strategic control over both sides of the Straits of Gibraltar, but so alienated its neighbours that soon the Marinids, Aragon and Castile—its three larger neighbours—formed an alliance against Granada.

== Rebellion ==
On 14 March 1309, Muhammad III was deposed in a palace coup and was replaced by his half-brother Nasr. At the same time, the triple alliance of the Marinids, Castile, and Aragon attacked Granada, and the ensuing war ended in various losses for Granada, including the return of Ceuta to the Marinids on 20 July 1309. Abu Said likely only returned to Málaga after this loss and continued his role as governor there. Unlike with the previous Sultan, Abu Said and his wife Fatima did not enjoy a good relation with Nasr. Furthermore, when Abu Said visited the capital to pay his respects, he found that the new Sultan was unpopular with the court. Apart from the losses in the war, Nasr—an astronomy enthusiast—was disliked for devoting himself to studying science, building astrolabes, and commissioning astronomical tables instead of working on state affairs. In addition, he was suspected of sympathising with the Christians, due to his Christian mother, his preference to dress in the Castilian manner, and his close ties with Ferdinand IV of Castile. Furthermore, the Sultan's vizier Muhammad ibn al-Hajj had grown up in Christian lands and spoke and dressed in the Castilian manner, adding to the dislike against the crown. A faction from court met with Abu Said and requested him to depose Nasr. According to the Arabist scholar Antonio Fernández-Puertas, Abu Said was further outraged at the drowning of Muhammad III at the order of Nasr after a failed attempt to restore him to the throne, but there are conflicting reports of when this assassination happened; other historians such as Francisco Vidal Castro considered the most likely date to be in February 1314, much after the start of the rebellion.

Abu Said raised an armed rebellion in 1311 in Málaga, proclaiming his son Ismail—deemed to have better legitimacy than his father, as he was a grandson of Muhammad II through Fatima—as Sultan. He formed a rival court loyal to his son but whose authorities were only recognised inside the wilaya (province) of Málaga. In the same year, the Málagan army conquered the castles of Antequera, Marbella and Vélez. The army then moved towards Granada and defeated Nasr's army in battle at a place called al-Atsha in the Vega of Granada. The Sultan himself and lost his horse and had to run back to Granada on foot. Abu Said proceeded to besiege the capital but lacked necessary supplies for a protracted campaign. Upon discovering that Nasr had allied himself with Ferdinand IV, Abu Said sought peace and was able to retain his post as governor of Málaga in exchange for paying tribute to the Sultan.

== Downfall of Abu Said and rise of Ismail ==
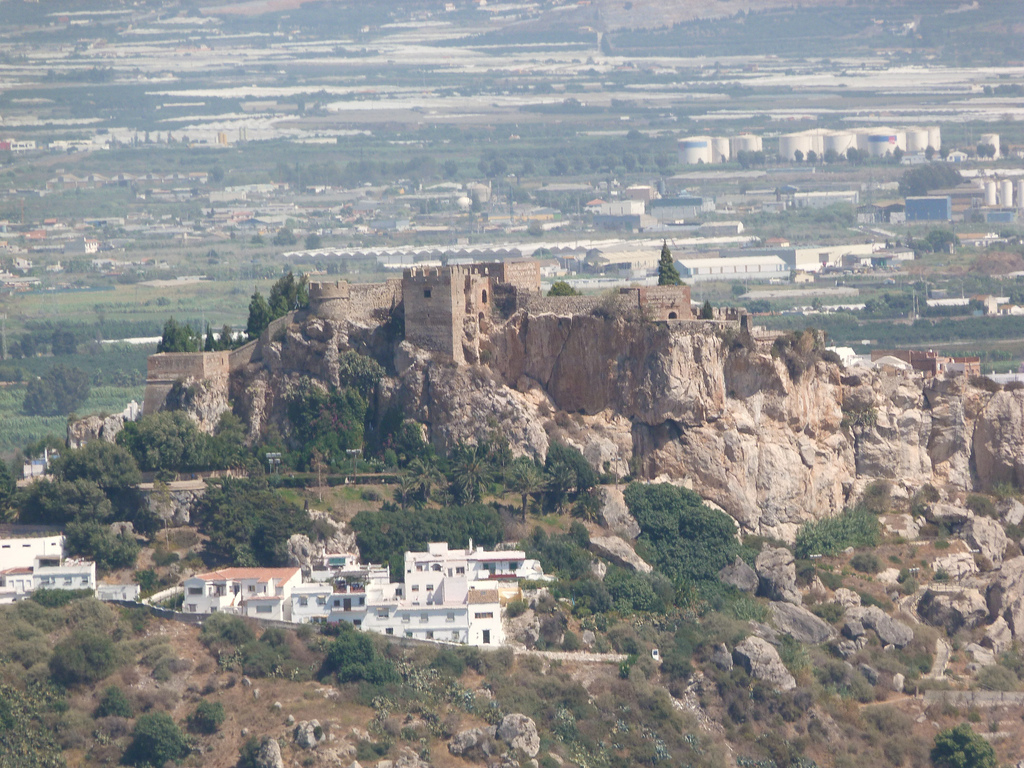
The castle of Salobreña, used as the royal family prison by the Nasrids, where Abu Said was imprisoned until his death.

Fearing the Sultan's vengeance, Abu Said sent Ibn Isa to negotiate a secret deal with the Marinids, in which he were to yield Málaga in exchange for the governorship of Salé in North Africa. When this became known to the people of Málaga, they considered it a treachery. They rose up and deposed him in favour of his son Ismail. Abu Said remained free although Ismail kept him under watch in Málaga. During a visit outside the city, Abu Said was suspected to attempt to flee and then captured by Málaga's citizens. Ismail arrived before his father was harmed. He ordered the imprisonment of his father and moved him to a castle in Cártama.

Meanwhile, the plot against Nasr continued at court, and Ismail restarted the rebellion with help from his mother Fatima and Uthman ibn al-Ula, the commander of the Volunteers of the Faith garrisoned in Málaga. As Ismail moved towards Granada, his army swelled and the capital's inhabitants opened the city gates for him. Nasr, besieged in the Alhambra fortress and palace complex, agreed to abdicate and retired to Guadix. Ismail took the throne in 1314, and ordered Abu Said moved to the Nasrid royal family prison in Salobreña. He remained in this castle—not being allowed to go beyond its gates—until he died in 24 April 1320 (14 Rabi al-Awwal 720 AH). His remains were brought to the capital, and he was buried in the royal cemetery (rawda) of the Alhambra, near the tomb of Muhammad II. His funeral was attended by Ismail I as well as the dignitaries of Granada. Centuries later with the surrender of Granada, the last Sultan Muhammad XI (also known as Boabdil) exhumed the bodies in this cemetery and reburied them in Mondújar, part of his Alpujarras estates.

== Bibliography ==
- Arié, Rachel (1973). L'Espagne musulmane au temps des Nasrides (1232–1492) (in French). Paris: E. de Boccard. OCLC 3207329.
- Boloix Gallardo, Bárbara (2016). "Mujer y poder en el Reino Nazarí de Granada: Fatima bint al-Ahmar, la perla central del collar de la dinastía (siglo XIV)". Anuario de Estudios Medievales (in Spanish). 46 (1). Consejo Superior de Investigaciones Científicas: 269–300. doi:10.3989/aem.2016.46.1.08.
- Catlos, Brian A. (2018). Kingdoms of Faith: A New History of Islamic Spain. London: C. Hurst & Co. ISBN 978-17-8738-003-5.
- Fernández-Puertas, Antonio (1997). "The Three Great Sultans of al-Dawla al-Ismā'īliyya al-Naṣriyya Who Built the Fourteenth-Century Alhambra: Ismā'īl I, Yūsuf I, Muḥammad V (713–793/1314–1391)". Journal of the Royal Asiatic Society. Third Series. 7 (1). London: 1–25. doi:10.1017/S1356186300008294. JSTOR 25183293.
- Harvey, L. P. (1992). Islamic Spain, 1250 to 1500. Chicago: University of Chicago Press. ISBN 978-0-226-31962-9.
- O'Callaghan, Joseph F. (2011). The Gibraltar Crusade: Castile and the Battle for the Strait. Philadelphia: University of Pennsylvania Press. ISBN 978-0812204636.
- Rubiera Mata, María Jesús (1969). "El Du l-Wizaratayn Ibn al-Hakim de Ronda" (PDF). Al-Andalus (in Spanish). 34. Madrid and Granada: Spanish National Research Council: 105–121.
- Rubiera Mata, María Jesús (1975). "El Arráez Abu Sa'id Faray B. Isma'il B. Nasr, gobernador de Málaga y epónimo de la segunda dinastía Nasari de Granada" (PDF). Boletín de la Asociación Española de Orientalistas (in Spanish). Madrid: Universidad Autónoma de Madrid: 127–133. ISSN 0571-3692.
- Vidal Castro, Francisco. "Ismail I". In Real Academia de la Historia (ed.). Diccionario Biográfico electrónico (in Spanish).
- Vidal Castro, Francisco (2004). "El asesinato político en al-Andalus: la muerte violenta del emir en la dinastía nazarí". In María Isabel Fierro (ed.). De muerte violenta: política, religión y violencia en Al-Andalus (in Spanish). Editorial CSIC - CSIC Press. pp. 349–398. ISBN 978-84-00-08268-0..
