= Torrenueva Costa =

- Municipality
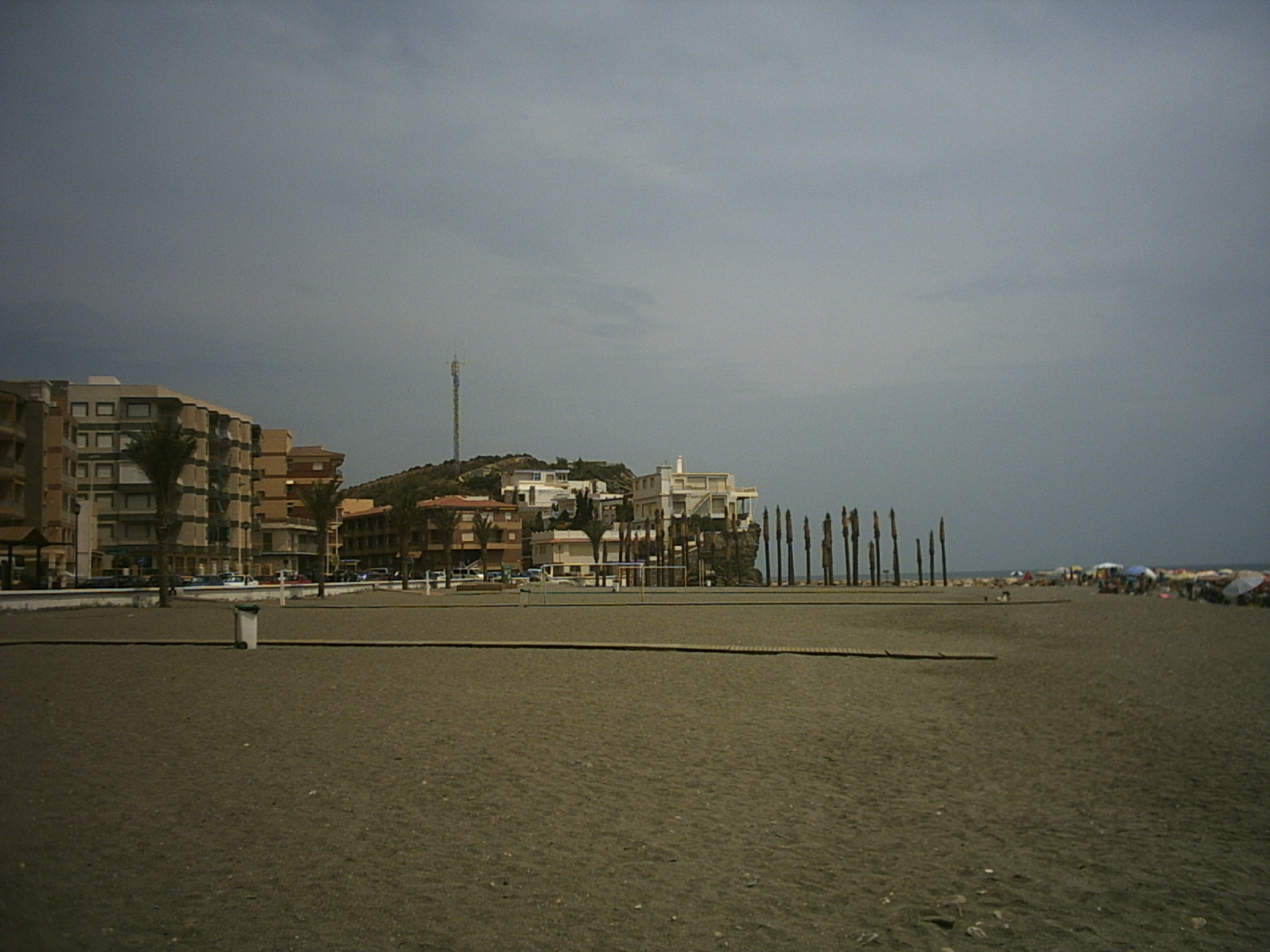

- Flag Coat of arms

- Location of Torrenueva Costa Torrenueva Costa (Spain)
- Coordinates: 36°42′7″N 3°29′9″W
- Country: Spain
- Community: Andalusia
- Province: Granada
- Comarca: Costa Tropical

Government
  - Mayor: Plácido Lara Maldonado (GRITO)
- Elevation: 1 m (3.3 ft)
- Demonym: Torreño
- Time zone: UTC+1 (CET)
  - Summer (DST): UTC+2 (CEST)
- Website: Official website

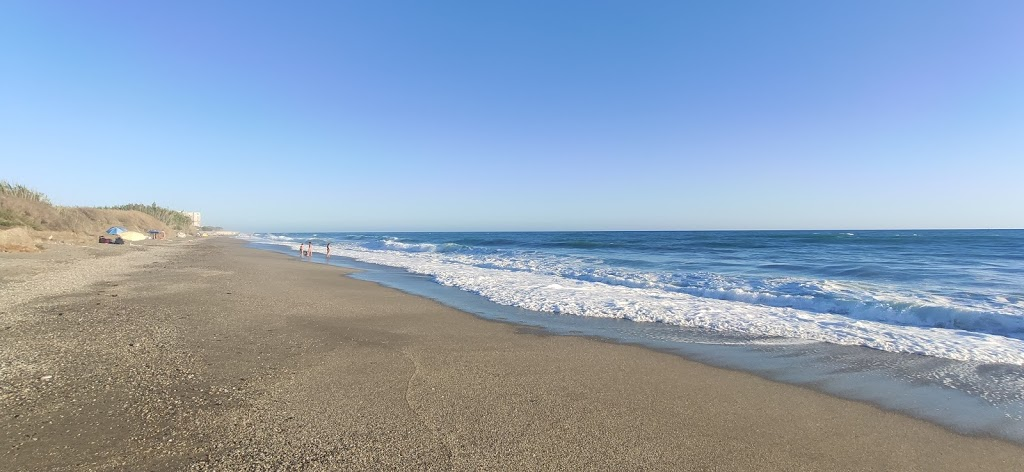
Maruja García Beach in Torrenueva Costa

Torrenueva Costa is a newly-created (2018) Spanish Municipality in the province of Granada and in the autonomous community Andalucía. It is located in the central part of the region of the Granada coast, and was formerly part of the municipality of Motril, from which it was constitutionally separated on 2 October 2018. Beside this locality are found the centres of El Varadero, La Chucha and Carchuna. It fills the occidental part of the cape Sacratif. The name of Torrenueva is taken from a century XVII defensive watchtower situated in the locality, in the south edge of the highway N-340 between Málaga and Almería, which runs through the locality. As an eminently touristic location, its beaches are populated by numerous swimmers from many sources-mainly from the rest of the granadine province, Jaén and Ciudad Real- during the summer months. In low season, local population is very low.

== Beaches ==
Torrenueva Costa belongs to the Costa Tropical, a large region of the coast is very famous and touristic.

The weather is usually good, so they are very popular during the summer by people from the surrounding as well as the interior regions. The main problems are the wind and the jellyfish.

There are several beaches, but the most popular are the following:

=== Playa de Torrenueva (Torrenueva) ===
Main characteristics

·Composition of the surface: gravel and pebbles.

·Max. capacity: about 23,000 people.

·Sea state: almost quiet water.

·Facilities: car parking, showers, a first aid stand, beach cleaning, ships rental, bars and S.O.S. telephones.

=== Playa de la Joya (nudist beach) ===
Main characteristics

·Composition of the surface: gravel and pebbles.

·Max. capacity: 800 people (a hidden beach).

·Sea state: almost quiet water.

·Facilities: pedestrian access from N-340 and beach cleaning.

=== Playa Maruja García (Maruja García Beach) ===
With a width of about 15 meters, it is a dark sand beach that runs along 300 m of coastline between the Port of Motril and Torrenueva Costa. It is located between Playa del Cañón and Playa de La Chincheta. Easily accessible, it has a low occupancy level.

Main characteristics

·Composition of the surface: fine dark sand.

·Sea state: almost quiet water.

·Facilities: beach cleaning.

== Politics ==
=== Torrenueva Segregation from Motril ===
Although most of the population of Torrenueva has always been reluctant to be part of the Municipality of Motril, it wasn't till 11 September 1987 when it became an EATIM and it granted some autonomy. Six years later, with the consent of the consistory of Motril, Torrenueva territorial limits were approved. The territorial limits of the EATIM of Torrenueva, which belongs to the Municipality of Motril (Granada), as they have been reflected in the obrante plane in the expedient, April 1993, at 1: 5,000, and described below:

“South, Mediterranean sea; West, from Rambla de Puntalón to the service road of the Acequia de los Antiguos Riegos; North, from Acequia de los Antiguos Riegos to Rambla de Villanueva, from Rambla de Villanueva upstream to reach the northern edge of the estate of the Cañada Esparragona with the property of the García Jiménez brothers, to the water division with Carchuna; East, from the water division with Carchuna to the Mediterranean Sea, including Playa del Salmonete as part of the delimitation of Torrenueva.”

In October 2010 it was denied by the City of Motril the segregation request for the EATIM Torrenueva to be an independent municipality, with the advocacy of IU and PSOE, and the disavowal of the government team headed by Carlos Rojas.

Finally, on October 2, 2018, Torrenueva became an independent municipality under the name of Torrenueva Costa. This name was selected in June 2017 in a popular referendum, as the new municipality couldn't have the same name as any other municipality in Spain, and the exists a Torrenueva in the province of Ciudad Real.

== See also ==
- A-7, between Motril and Almería
- N-340, Road of Almería
- List of municipalities in Granada
