= Rubiera (surname) =

Rubiera is a surname. Notable people with the surname include:

- Baldomero Rubiera (1926–2018), Cuban gymnast
- José Luis Rubiera (born 1973), Spanish road bicycle racer
- María Jesús Rubiera Mata (1942–2009), Spanish historian
