= Costa Granadina =

Coordinates: 36°45′N 3°36′W

- Comarca
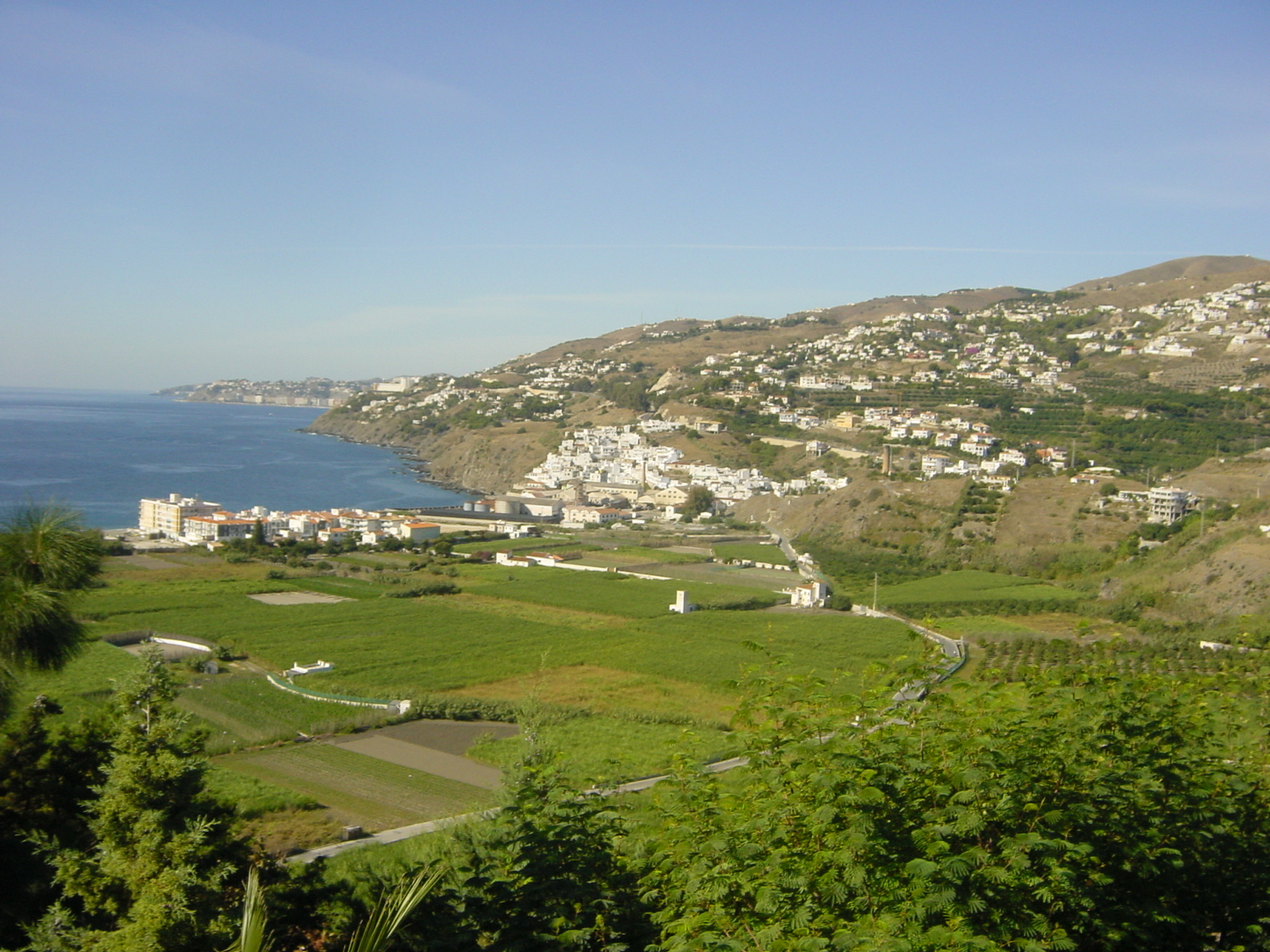
- Landscape of the Costa Granadina near Salobreña.

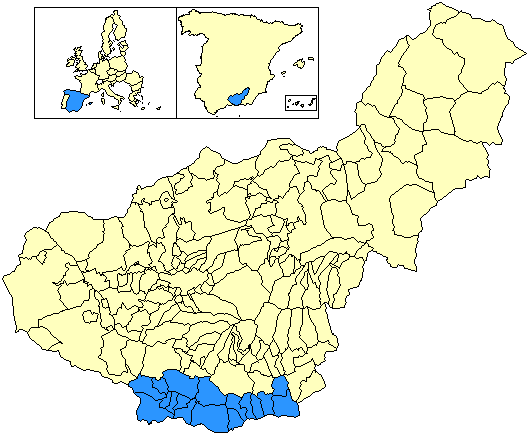
- Location of the Costa Granadina in Granada province
- Country: Spain
- Region: Andalusia

Area
  - Total: 786.88 km^{2} (303.82 sq mi)

Population (2023)
  - Total: 125,988
  - Density: 160.11/km^{2} (414.69/sq mi)

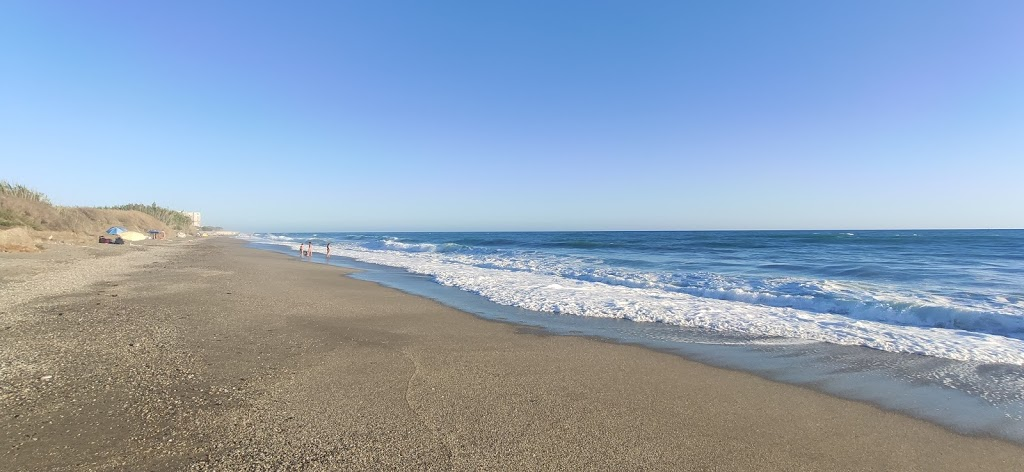
Maruja García Beach in Torrenueva Costa

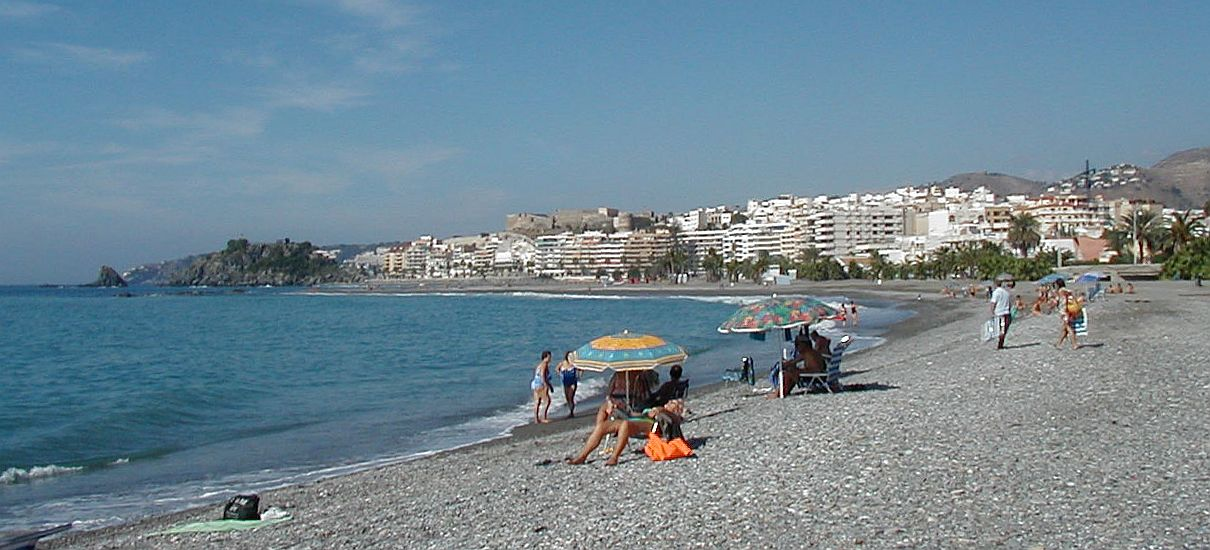
Puerta del Mar beach in Almuñécar

Costa Granadina (Spanish: [ˈkosta ɡɾanaˈðina]; "Granadan Coast") is a comarca in southern Spain, corresponding to the Mediterranean coastline of the province of Granada. It is also but less frequently called the Costa Tropical or Costa de Granada. This comarca was established in 2003 by the Government of Andalusia.

It is crossed by the N-340 coastal highway that runs southwest–northeast along Spain's Mediterranean coast, to the border with France. Within the last 4 years the A7 motorway has been extended along the coast from Nerja in the Málaga province to Motril where it links the A7 motorway to the A44 motorway which heads north from Motril to the city of Granada.

== Geography ==
The Costa Granadina is made up mostly of agricultural zones and small resort towns and villages. What makes the Costa Granadina unique in comparison to the rest of the Spanish coast is that the mountains of the Sierra Nevada range fall to the very edge of the Mediterranean Sea on the rugged coastline. Except for la vega de Motril, there are no flat areas for large urban sprawl.

== Climate ==
The area east of Málaga is less dry and more lush than the surrounding areas. This is because the Sierra Nevada mountain range that serves as a backdrop to the Costa Granadina catches more rain and thus supplies the area with abundant irrigation. This same mountain backdrop provides a shelter from northerlies and creates a pleasant microclimate of very mild winters and mild summers compared to the interior of Spain, with temperature differences of 10 °C (18 °F) relative to the area on the other side of the mountains – so it could be 38 °C (100 °F) on a summer day in the city of Granada and only around 28 °C (82 °F) on the Costa Granadina. In the winter, it can be snowing in Granada and around 17 °C (63 °F) on the Costa Granadina. The Costa Granadina, with more than 320 sunny days and more than 3000 sunshine hours a year, has an unusual borderline subtropical microclimate. The Sierra Nevada mountain range, protects this coast from the cold north winds due to the Föhn effect that creates a subtropical frost-free microclimate with very mild winter temperatures. The average annual temperature ranges between 18 and 20 degrees: While summers are warm, hovering the maximums between 27 and 31 degrees while winters are very mild, with maximums between 17 and 19 degrees and minimums between 10 - 12 degrees, with the annual rainfall of around 500 mm/year (however, Motril has a warm semi-arid climate (BSh) due to its low annual rainfall 378.9mm).

The climatic conditions of the Costa Granadina supports a cultivation of exotic tropical fruits unique in Europe. This is the case of cherimoya, which has a designation of origin and has made Spain the world's leading producer of this fruit. There are also crops of papayas, avocados, mangoes, guavas, litchi, etc.

Another typical farming on the Costa Granadina is sugar cane that is only grown here in the entire European continent.

== Municipalities ==
The main towns of the Costa Granadina are Motril, Almuñécar and Salobreña. Motril is principally a manufacturing and agricultural center (horticulture, vegetables, tropical fruits and some sugar cane, although the last is declining). Motril also possesses the main seaport in the Costa Granadina. Almuñécar is primarily a resort town and agricultural center (tropical fruits), with the summer-time vacation population more than tripling the town's population. Like the rest of the Spanish coast, it recently underwent a housing and construction boom with some environmental degradation. This housing boom was not as severe as on other parts of the Spanish coastline due to the townships of Almuñécar and La Herradura being unable to agree the terms of their new Urban plan (PGOU) since 2002.

There are 18 municipalities, running along this coast or inland behind the coast, and listed below from west to east:

Arms	Municipality	Area (km^{2})	Population (2023)	Density (/km^{2})	Includes localities of
	Albondón	34.5	735	21,3	
	Albuñol	62.9	7,391	117,5	La Rabita
	Almuñécar	83.4	27,305	327,4	La Herradura, Velilla-Taramay
	Los Guájares	89.3	1,157	13,0	Guájar Alto, Guájar-Faragüit, Guájar Fondón
	Gualchos	31.0	5,308	171,2	Castell de Ferro
	Ítrabo	19.0	960	50,5	
	Jete	13.9	994	71,5	
	Lentegí	23.8	339	14,2	
	Lújar	36.9	480	13,0	
	Molvízar	21.5	2,752	128,0	
	Motril	109.8	58,939	536,8	El Varadero, Carchuna, Calahonda
	Otívar	57.5	1,034	18,0	
	Polopos	26.6	1,644	61,8	La Mamola, Castillo de Baños, La Guapa, Haza del Trigo
	Rubite	28.6	406	14,2	Caserones
	Salobreña	34.9	12,562	359,9	Alfa Mar, Clsta Aguilera, El Pargo, Lobres
	Sorvilán	34.3	524	15,3	Alfornón
	Torrenueva Costa	7	3,115	445	
	Vélez de Benaudalla	79.1	3,013	38,1	
	Totals	786.9	125,988	159,5	

== Points of interest ==
The Costa Granadina has many historical sights, including prehistoric cave paintings in nearby Nerja; many Roman ruins including roads, bridges, buildings, fish salting factories, and irrigation systems used to this day; and abundant remains of the many-centuries domination of the region by the Arab conquerors. In fact, Almuñécar served as the entry point to Iberia and establishment of a power base for Abd ar-Rahman I in 755, who came from Damascus and was the founder of an independent Muslim dynasty that ruled the greater part of the Iberian Peninsula for nearly three centuries thereafter.
