= Maruja García Beach =

Beach in Andalusia, Spain

Maruja García Beach Maruja Beach
- Beach
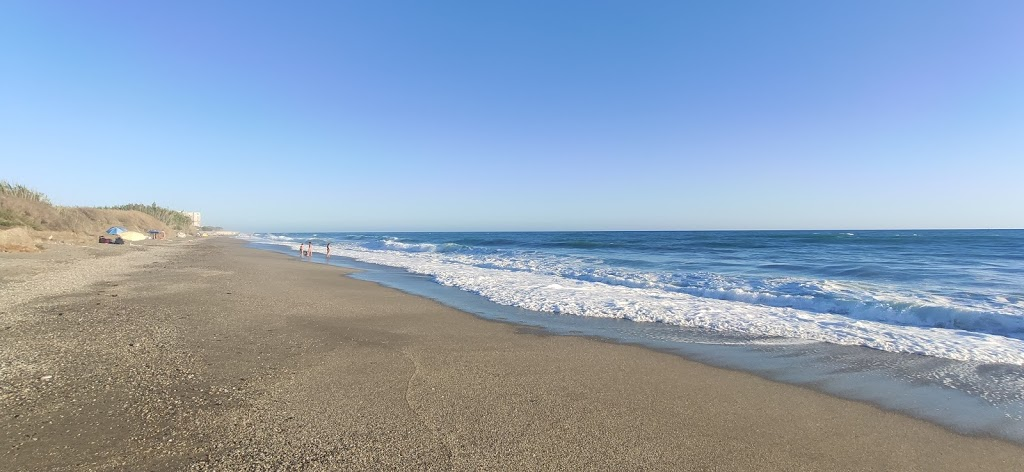
- Fine black sand meets crystal clear water at Playa Maruja Beach
- Interactive map of Maruja García Beach
- Coordinates: 36°42′48″N 3°30′10″W
- Location: Torrenueva Costa, Granada, Spain
- Geology: Beach

Dimensions
  - Length: 300 m (980 ft)
  - Width: 15 m (49 ft)
- Elevation: 0 m (0 ft)
- Website: http://www.torrenuevagranada.es

Maruja García beach, commonly called Playa Maruja, is located in the Spanish municipalities of Motril and Torrenueva Costa, in the province of Granada, autonomous community of Andalusia.

With a width of about 15 meters, it is a dark sand beach that runs along 300 m of coastline between the Port of Motril and Torrenueva Costa. It is located between Playa del Cañón and Playa de La Chincheta. Easily accessible, it has a low occupancy level.

It is one of the most recommended beaches to visit on the Costa Tropical.

The beach refers to Maruja García, a neighbor of the municipality of Torrenueva Costa, named in her honor on behalf of all the mothers, grandmothers and working women of the municipality.

== See also ==
- Torrenueva Costa
- Costa Tropical
