= Mikel de Epalza =

Spanish Arabist, historian, translator and professor

Mikel de Epalza Ferrer (1938 – 6 December 2008) was a Spanish academic who was a specialist in Arab and Islamic studies.

Born in Pau, France in 1938, he was a specialist on Mudéjars (Muslims permitted to remain in the Christian realms of the medieval Iberian peninsula) and Moriscos (converts from Islam to Christianity in the same era). He encouraged good relations between Mediterranean European and North African nations. He had previously been a Jesuit, and worked in Algeria and Tunisia.

He was a professor of Arab and Islamic studies at the University of Alicante. In 2001, he completed a Catalan language translation of the Quran which he titled L'Alcorà. The translation received an award from the city of Barcelona, and was the joint winner of the 2002 National Prize for Translation, alongside the Hellenist Carlos García Gual. His origin was in fact Basque, and his native language was Spanish.

He was married to María Jesús Rubiera Mata, a colleague in his university department. He died at the age of 70, months after a severe traffic accident in May 2008.
