= Catalina of Motril =

Enslaved Moorish royal bedchamber servant (fl. 1501–1531)

Catalina of Motril (fl. 1501–1531), was an enslaved Moorish royal bedchamber servant from the Kingdom of Granada. She worked for Catherine of Aragon in England.

Of Muslim Moorish origin, she was enslaved and converted to Christianity and given the name Catalina after Catherine of Aragon, whom she accompanied to England as a chamber maid upon the marriage between Catherine of Aragon and Arthur Prince of Wales in 1501. She was present at the wedding of Catherine of Aragon and Henry VIII in 1509. She returned to Spain and married, but was called to testify in the divorce proceedings of Catherine of Aragon and Henry VIII in 1531.

== Life ==
Motril, where Catalina was born, is on the coast. It fell to the Catholic Monarchs in 1489, a few years before the capital city, Granada, surrendered in 1492.

We do not know the circumstances in which, sometime before 1501, she was enslaved. Enslavement of Muslims depended on how a community surrendered. The city of Granada itself received terms in the Treaty of Granada that initially protected inhabitants from enslavement, whereas the inhabitants of towns that had been taken by force were more likely to be enslaved. Financial records of the Spanish court show that Juan Davalos of Granada was paid for a slave for the Princess of Wales, as Catherine was then known. The accounts of Alonseo de Morales note in 20 August 1501 that Juan Davalos of Granada was paid 25,000 mrs. "Por una esclava que de el se tomo para la princesa de Gales [for a female slave whom he had given to the Princess of Wales]".

She was given the Christian name Catalina, after Catherine of Aragon, when she converted to Christianity in accordance with the custom to convert to the religion of the enslaver, which was the custom practised by both Christian and Muslim slave owners at the time. There were two anonymous 'esclavas' (slaves) listed in Catherine's entourage when she travelled to England in 1501 to marry Arthur, Prince of Wales. Catalina is likely to have been one of these two. She was referred to as 'Catalina, once the Queen's slave' over 30 years later, after she had left Catherine's service. Catalina's exact status in the service of Catherine of Aragon is unknown. As slavery was illegal in England at that time, her enslavement would in effect no longer have been considered legal after her arrival to England.

Catalina was still a part of Catherine's household in 1509, as the Spanish Ambassador noted that she witnessed the first intercourse between Catherine of Aragon and Henry VIII after their marriage that year. In 1531, when Henry VIII issued an investigation to obtain a divorce from Catherine, Catalina was called to testify that Catherine had not been a virgin on her wedding night. In 1531, Catalina was described as "once the Queen's slave, who used to make her bed and attend to other services of the chamber", and that she had since then left England for Spain, where she had married the Morisco Cross bow maker Oviedo and lived with him in Málaga and had two daughters with him, and that she now resided as a widow in her birth town of Motril.

It is unknown whether she attended the court to testify.

== Fiction ==
In The Spanish Princess, Catalina of Motril appears as Catalina de Cardonnes, a Morisco lady-in-waiting to Catherine of Aragon, played by Stephanie Levi-John.
