= Port of Motril =

Spanish port located at Motril (Granada)

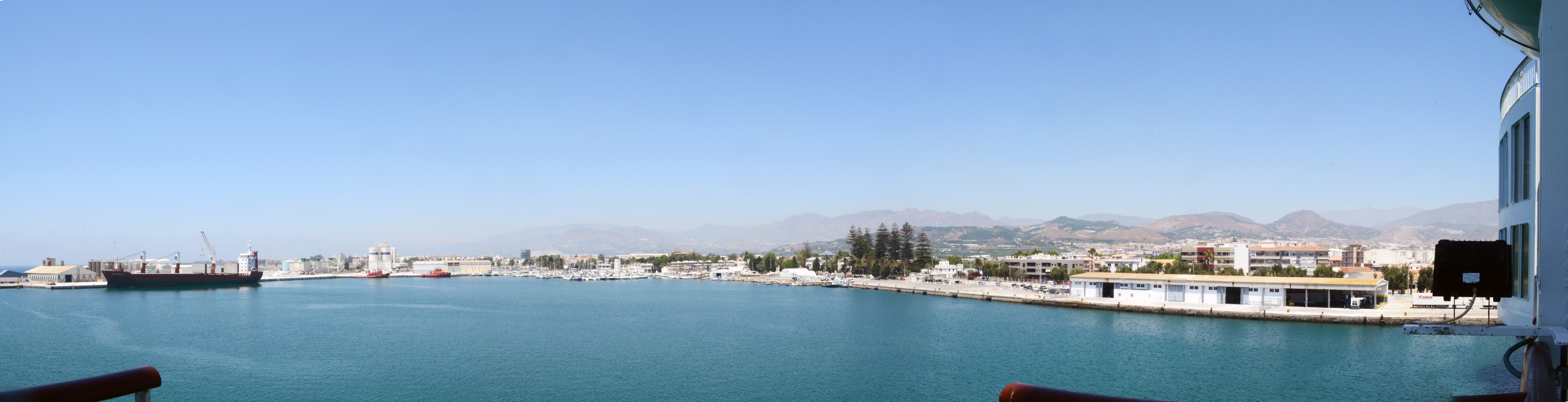

Location
- Country: Spain
- Location: Motril
- Coordinates: 36°43′06″N 03°31′30″W
- UN/LOCODE: ESMOT

Details
- Operated by: Port Authority of Motril

Statistics
- Annual cargo tonnage: 2.8 million tonnes (2019)

The Port of Motril–Granada or simply, the port of Motril, is a passenger and cargo port in Motril, province of Granada, Spain. It is one of the Puertos de Interés General del Estado ("ports of General Interest of the State").

== History and description ==
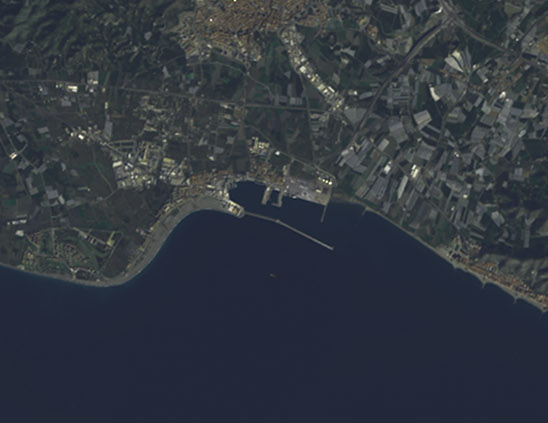
Satellite view

The foundation stone was laid on 21 October 1908. Building works ended in 1927. A bulk cargo dock was opened in 1994.

On 1 October 2005, the standalone Port Authority of Motril was created, upon a split from the Port Authority of Almería. Two years later, the expansion of the Azucenas dock was inaugurated, featuring ro-ro capabilities.

It is connected by ferry to Nador, Melilla, Al-Hoceima and Tanger-Med.

The port closed its 2019 year with a total cargo traffic of 2.8 million tonnes.
