= Castell de Ferro =

Human settlement in Granada Province, Spain

Coordinates: 36.7225°N 3.3592°W

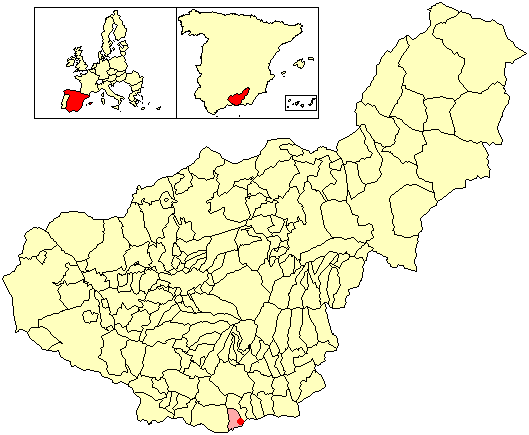

Castell de Ferro, located in the province of Granada, is known principally for its tourism, its agriculture and its conservation of traditional constructions. However, the beachfront is full of modern apartments.

Castell de Ferro is situated in the central part of Granada's coast. Near this location we can find El Romeral, Calahonda y La Mamola. The Castell de Ferro's coast is characterized for its numerous caves and its beaches.

== Toponymy ==
According to Manuel Sanchis Guarner, Castell de Ferro comes from the Mozarabic autochthonous evolution that conserves archaisms such as the non-diphthongization of the Latin letter É. The survival of these archaisms, is explained by the greater fidelity to the Latin Andalusian romance. It has been attempted sometimes to justify, without much foundation, the influence in the toponomy of emigrants arrived after the Christian conquest. This same phenomenon occurs in other names such as Ferreira or Poqueira, which are believed to have similarities with the Galician language.

A more likely explanation is that the change from "castil" to "castell" took place between the seventeenth and nineteenth centuries when large numbers of expats returned from Catalonia accompanied by Catalans. The word would have changed under the influence of the Catalan language which allows for the LL digraph in final position, pronounced /ʎ/ as in castell /kəs'teʎ/.

== History ==
The origin of Castell de Ferro dates back to Phoenician times, according to some historians. It has many architectural remains of Arab origin or perhaps Roman. It has a tremendous tower overlooking the town from the hill, which may have that Phoenician source, although it has Arabic characteristics. Over the Marsa al-Firruy, al-Idrisi wrote, during the 12th century, about discovering the path that led from Málaga to Almería along the coast.

Muslims said that the city was "A port with a little pond." By then, his role was mainly port. The stronghold does not seem to be documented until the fifteenth century, some sources refer to it with the term "Castil". This curious name seems to have romance origins, but after an Arabic adaptation it ended up with the name of Castil de fierro. It ended up with its actual name due to the influence of the local fishermen, who pronounced Castel de Ferro. Since the 1960s it has experienced an increasing tourism and agricultural development.

== Demography ==
According to the National Statistical Institute of Spain, in 2014 Castell de Ferro had 2964 registered inhabitants, representing 59.58% of the total population of the municipality.

== Monuments ==
Among the architectural elements Castell de Ferro has because of its history, its Moorish castle stands out. It has Nazari origins and its currently unfinished. Other elements of the period are three watchtowers that were lookouts and defenses against the Barbary pirates who came to their shores, and la Torre de Cambriles, la Torre de la Estancia and la Torre del Zambullón.

With Roman origins according to scholars of heritage, we can find the Torre de la Rijana, located a few kilometers from Castell de Ferro, who heads a small side creek very appreciated by tourism and has become famous for the filming of the movie " Al sur de Granda”.

== Coast ==
This part of the Costa Tropical is the least known by foreign tourists. Castell de Ferro, known for its clear waters, has some of the most beautiful beaches among the mediterranean coast.

With its lack of infrastructure, this beach is still relatively untouched. It is an area of crops and intensive farming of high quality, such as cucumbers, zucchini, peppers and avocados, most of which are for export to Northern Europe and other areas of Spain.

One of the most visited beaches is la Rijana, were you can go for a relaxed swim among with other visitants and tourists. The Rijana despite being located in the Costa Tropical of Granada, has always been named one of the best and most voted beaches of the Costa del Sol
