= Gualchos =

- Municipality
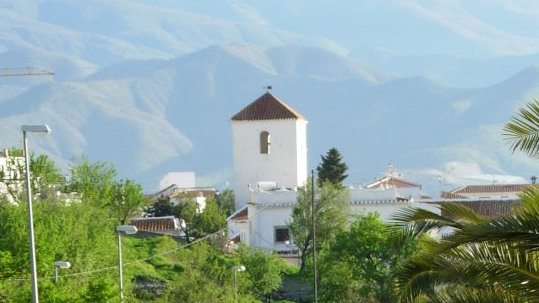

- Flag Coat of arms

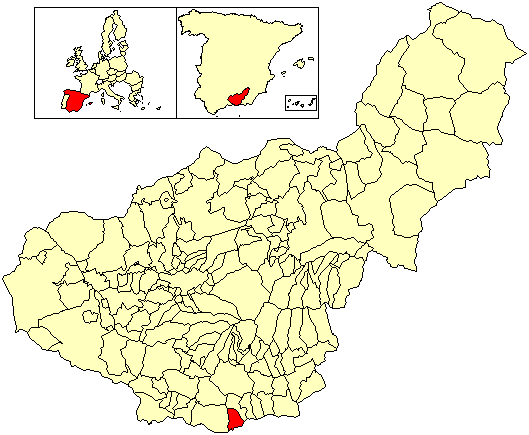
- Location of Gualchos

- Location in Spain
- Coordinates: 36°44′38.5″N 3°23′23.6″W
- Country: Spain
- Autonomous community: Andalusia
- Province: Granada
- Comarca: Costa Tropical
- Judicial district: Motril

Government
  - Alcalde: Miguel Díaz Juárez(2007)

Area
  - Total: 31.03 km^{2} (11.98 sq mi)

Population (2025-01-01)
  - Total: 5,284
  - Density: 170.3/km^{2} (441.0/sq mi)
- Demonym: gualchero/a
- Time zone: UTC+1 (CET)
  - Summer (DST): UTC+2 (CEST)

Gualchos (or Gualchos-Castell de Ferro) is a town in the Spanish province of Granada. It has an area of 31 square kilometers and a population, in 2001, of 2,759, for a population density of 89 people per square kilometer.

== Natural environment ==
The environment of what the natives call Eagle Peak, features plants that grow spontaneously and without any cropping, esparto, palm, several species of thyme and other medicinal plants such as zahareña (cattails), traditionally used in folk medicine to treat wounds. You can also find numerous species of fauna: ibex, wild boar, rabbits, hares, etc.

== See also ==
- List of municipalities in Granada
