= Molvízar =

- Municipality
- The village of Molvízar seen from the hilltop La Guindalera

- Flag Coat of arms

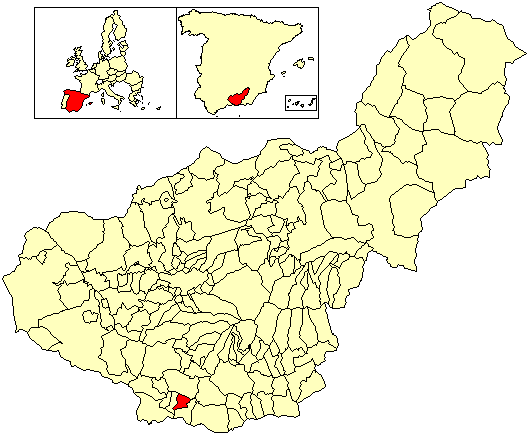
- Location of Molvízar

- Location in Spain
- Coordinates: 36°47′N 3°36′W
- Country: Spain
- Autonomous community: Andalusia
- Province: Granada
- Comarca: Costa Tropical
- Judicial district: Motril
- Commonwealth: Costa Tropical

Government
  - Alcalde: Francisco Fermín García Puentedura (2007) (PP)

Area
  - Total: 21.47 km^{2} (8.29 sq mi)
- Elevation: 241 m (791 ft)

Population (2025-01-01)
  - Total: 2,689
  - Density: 125.2/km^{2} (324.4/sq mi)
- Demonym(s): Molviceño, -ña
- Time zone: UTC+1 (CET)
  - Summer (DST): UTC+2 (CEST)
- Postal code: 18611
- Website: Official website

Molvízar is a small town and municipality located in the province of Granada, in Spain. Between 1905 and 2005, the population has ranged between 1500 and 3500 inhabitants. It is located in the foothills of the mountains of southern Spain, approximately five kilometres from the Costa Tropical coast.

Agriculture is a large part of its economy, with an increasing contribution from European tourism, with visitors attracted by its year-round temperate weather.

Locals celebrate the patron saint, Santa Ana, on July 26, during which the town puts forth a traditional representation of "Moros y Cristianos" (Moors and Christians), which commemorates the Reconquista expulsion of the Moors from Spain. The city is also the birthplace of anarchist revolutionary Antonio Ramón.

== See also ==
- List of municipalities in Granada
