= Rubite =

Coordinates: 36.8089°N 3.34722°W

- Village
- Flag Coat of arms

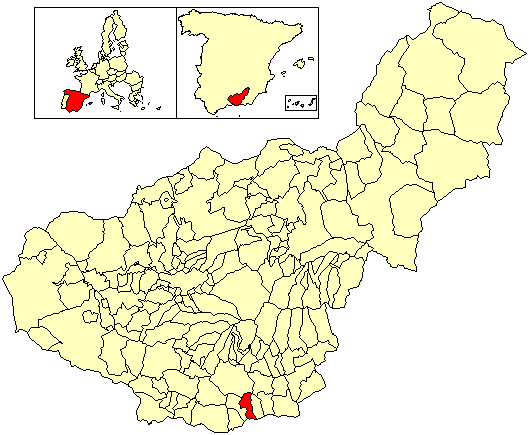
- Location of Rubite
- Country: Spain
- Province: Granada
- Municipality: Rubite

Area
  - Total: 28 km^{2} (11 sq mi)

Population (2025-01-01)
  - Total: 419
  - Density: 15/km^{2} (39/sq mi)
- Time zone: UTC+1 (CET)
  - Summer (DST): UTC+2 (CEST)

Rubite is a municipality located in the province of Granada, Spain. According to the 2004 census (INE), the village had a population of 492 inhabitants. Rubite is a locality and Spanish municipality situated at the east central of the region "La Costa Granadina" in the province of Granada, independent community of Andalusia. On the shores of the Mediterranean Sea, Rubite is bordered by the municipalities of Lújar, Órgiva and Polopos.

== Location ==
Nestled in the southwest of the province of Granada, Rubite is at the bottom of the Sierra de Lujar and Contraviesa, 80 km away from Granada's capital.

== Customs ==
The grape harvest celebrated in October is maybe the only tradition that remains nowadays where the grapes are trampled with "agobias" (little straw shoes). The wine of Rubite is really important for the region of La Alpujarra.

== History ==
Rubite is a mozarabic word and a Latin word "Rubus-Robetum" that means bramble. The first record of the town dates from the Andalusian period

Between the 13th and 15th centuries in the Sierra de la Contraviesa. In the 16th century a significant number fled the North African Moors, leaving the area unpopulated but in the repopulation of the 18th century, the area increased markedly in population and economic prosperity. In the 17th century the sale of land and houses to farmers in the region was authorized, although paying the Count of Cifuentes. The decline of grape growing in the 19th century forced the village to make almonds its main production.

The Rubiteños have been called lifelong Güenos of Rubite. The origin lies in an occurrence of the early 19th century . There was by then a family surnamed "Bueno". In autumn 1810 a routine patrol of the French army was surprised by Bueno family members on their properties. In the confrontation, French soldiers were killed. The story spread quickly through the surrounding area, leaving the Buenos as an example of patriotism for all residents.

== See also ==
- List of municipalities in Granada
