= Salobreña =

- Municipality
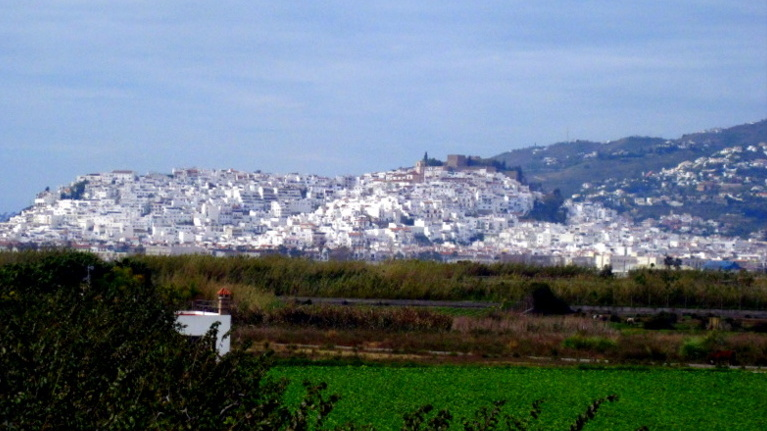
- Salobreña

- Flag Coat of arms

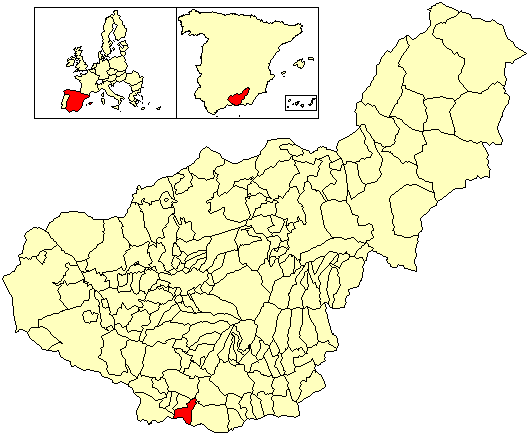
- Location of Salobreña

- Location in Spain Salobreña (Andalusia) Salobreña (Spain)
- Coordinates: 36°44′48″N 3°35′13″W
- Country: Spain
- Autonomous community: Andalucía
- Province: Granada
- Comarca: Costa Granadina
- Judicial district: Motril

Government
  - Mayor: María Eugenia Rufino Morales (PSOE)

Area
  - Total: 34.91 km^{2} (13.48 sq mi)
- Elevation: 95 m (312 ft)
- Highest elevation: 160 m (520 ft)
- Lowest elevation: 0 m (0 ft)

Population (2025-01-01)
  - Total: 12,760
  - Density: 365.5/km^{2} (946.7/sq mi)
- Demonym(s): Salobreñero, -ra
- Time zone: UTC+1 (CET)
  - Summer (DST): UTC+2 (CEST)
- Postal code: 18680 (Salobreña y La Caleta-Guardia), 18610 (Lobres)
- Official language(s): Spanish
- Website: www.ayto-salobrena.org

Salobreña (pronounced [saloˈβɾeɲa]) is a town on the Costa Granadina in Granada, Spain. It claims a history stretching back 6,000 years.

There are two main parts of Salobreña; The first is The Old Town which sits atop a rocky prominence and is a cluster of whitewashed houses and steep narrow streets leading up to a tenth-century Moorish castle, called 'Castillo de Salobreña' and it is one of its main tourist attractions.

The second part of Salobreña is new developments which spread from the bottom of the Old Town right to the beach. The whole town is almost surrounded by sugarcane fields on each side along the coast and further inland.

Another tourist attraction in Salobreña is 'El Peñón' (The Rock), which divides two of Salobreña's five beaches and juts out between Playa La Guardia and Playa de la Charca/Solamar and into the sea.

== History ==
=== Geological background ===
At the close of the Last Glacial Maximum, the Motril-Salobreña plain on which Salobreña now stands was not yet land: rather it was a large bay studded with a number of dolomite crags which were islands, most prominently the formation now known as Monte Hacho (73m) and the headland on which Salobreña now stands (110m). The Guadalfeo river drained into the bay, running down the Tajo de los Vados gorge which separates the Sierra de Escalate to the north-east of Salobreña from the Sierra de Chaparral to the west. The river gradually filled the bay with silt comprising post-orogenic, miocenic, and quaternary material, producing a fertile alluvial plain, on which agriculture could begin by the Bronze Age. At this time, the outcrop on which the old town of Salobreña now stands had become a peninsula. Meanwhile, the rocky outcrop of the Peñon, which now juts from La Guardia beach into the sea, remained an island into the seventeenth century. A map of 1722 is the first evidence that the beach had reached it, making it a peninsula.

=== Ancient ===
Archaeological finds show human habitation around Salobreña at the rocky promontory known as the Peñon beginning in the Neolithic period, when the Peñon was still an island, with strata perhaps beginning as early as the palaeolithic period and continuing into the Bronze Age at the Cueva del Capitán (Captain's Cave) in the nearby hamlet of Lobres. Evidence of Bronze Age settlement from around 1500 BCE has also been found on the Salobreña headland and, slightly further inland again, Monte Hacho. Such settlements would have been characteristic of the settlement of easily defensible rocky headlands in the region at the time.

Salobreña is thought to have experienced contact with the Phoenicians around the eighth century BCE and then Greek and Punic culture around the sixth. At this time, its name is attested as Selambina. A major impact of Roman culture is, however, visible for the second century BCE, attested in widespread archaeological finds.

=== Medieval ===
In 713 CE, the region of Elvira (roughly corresponding to the Province of Granada today) came under the Arab rule of Mūsa bin Nusayr, and by the tenth century, a castle (ḥiṣn) at Salobreña is recorded in Ahmad ibn Muhammad ibn Musa al-Razi's Crónica del moro Rasis. Al-Razi also noted the introduction of the cultivation of sugar cane at Salobreña. The main crop of medieval Salobreña was sugar-cane, though other attested crops include cumin and bananas. By the eleventh century, Ibn Hayyan could refer to Salobreña as a medina ('town'), a denomination that became usual by the fourteenth century, when Salobreña was the seat of government for surrounding hamlets like Vélez de Benaudalla, Molvizar, and Lobres.

In 1489, Granada came under Castilian rule, and Francisco Ramirez de Madrid became governor of Salobreña's fortress and town. The next year, the inhabitants of the town supported the resistance of Muhammad XI of Granada to Castilian rule, which speeded the increase of Castilian migration into the settlement. In 1568-69, the Moriscos of Salobreña participated in revolts.

=== Modern ===
Sugar-cane remained key to the town's economy through the sixteenth century, returning to prominence in the nineteenth. In between, cotton became the dominant crop. The early-modern history of Salobreña is not well understood. In the nineteenth century, however, Salobreña was strategically important in the Spanish War of Independence, and also adopted new steam-technologies for sugar production pioneered in Cuba. The expansion of the town in the second half of the nineteenth century that was driven by a boom in sugar-cane production led to the demolition of the last remains of its medieval walls. By the 1970s, settlement was expanding from the outcrop on which the old town sits onto the alluvial plain below.

Today, the economy of the coastal plain around Salobreña is based on tourism and sugarcane agriculture, while the mountains are characterised by terraced agriculture with almond and, increasingly, sub-tropical fruit trees (with custard apples and avocado pears being the first to be introduced). The last remaining cane sugar factory in Europe was located along the coast just west of the village of La Caleta de Salobreña. It closed in 2006.

== Climate ==
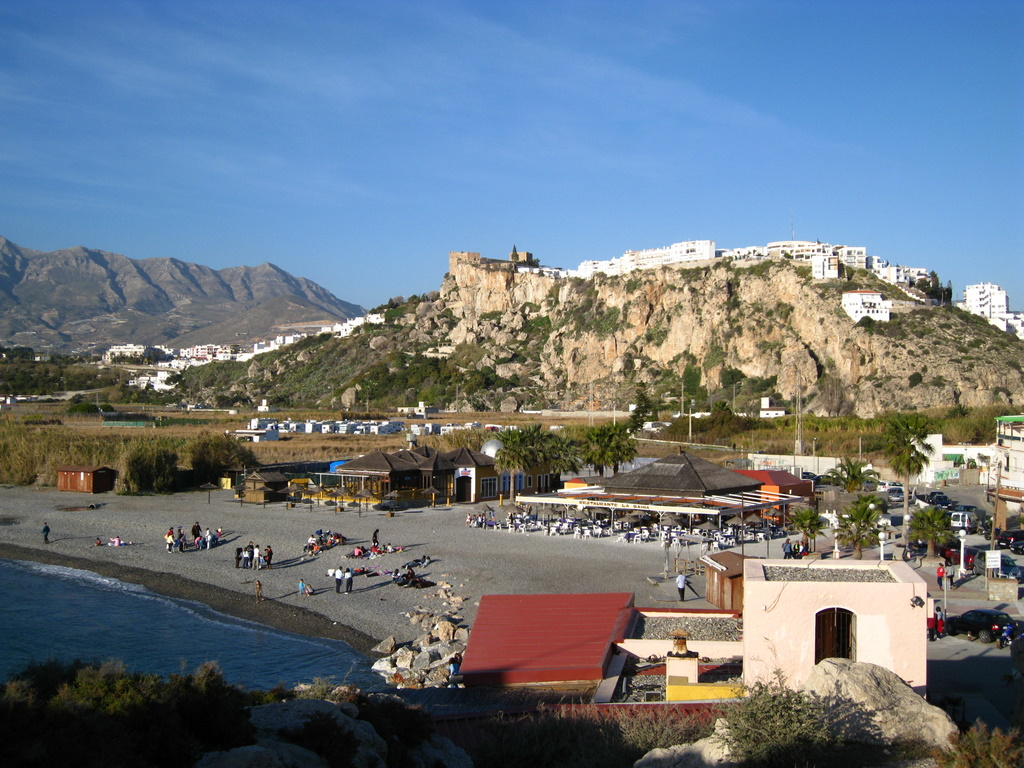
Beach and castle, photographed from the Peñon.

Salobreña's climate is a Mediterranean, semi-arid climate, with annual rainfall of 500mm per year, and whose microclimate is sub-tropical. In the hotter months, average temperatures are around 26 °C, peaking in August around the mid 30 °C's during the day and mid 20 °C's at night and around 13 °C in the colder months. The annual average temperature is 19 °C.

== See also ==
- List of municipalities in Granada
