= Motril =

- Municipality
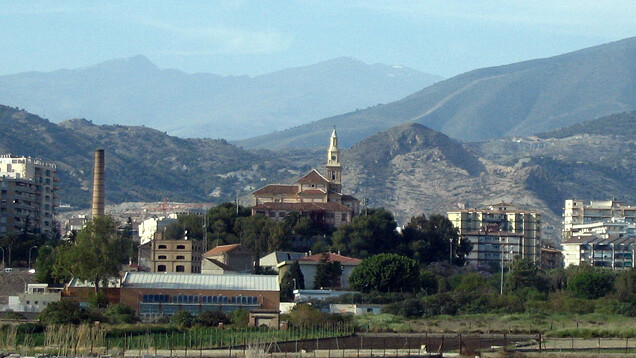

- Flag Coat of arms

- Location of Motril in the Province of Granada Location of Motril in Spain Motril (Spain)
- Coordinates: 36°45′N 3°31′W
- Country: Spain
- Autonomous community: Andalusia
- Province: Granada

Government
  - Alcaldesa: Luisa María García Chamorro (PP)

Area
  - Total: 109.77 km^{2} (42.38 sq mi)
- Elevation: 45 m (148 ft)

Population (2025-01-01)
  - Total: 59,862
  - Density: 545.34/km^{2} (1,412.4/sq mi)
- Demonym(s): Motrileño, -ña
- Time zone: UTC+1 (CET)
  - Summer (DST): UTC+2 (CEST)
- Postal code: 18600–18613
- Website: Official website

Motril (Spanish pronunciation: [moˈtɾil]) is a town and municipality of Spain belonging to the province of Granada, in the autonomous community of Andalusia.

The main settlement is located a few kilometers inland, separated from the Port of Motril by the Guadalfeo delta. Motril is the second most populated municipality in the province, with 60,368 inhabitants as of 2016.

== Population ==
Motril has 61,171 inhabitants across an area of 110km^{2} as of 2012. Over the last several centuries the population has risen from 4,300 in 1610, with migration the most significant factor especially in earlier periods.

== History ==
Although its exact origins remain unclear, Motril started as a Phoenician enclave, and continued to exist in Roman times.

Sugarcane was brought to the area by Arabs as a result of the Muslim conquest of the Iberian Peninsula.

The area yielded to the Catholic Monarchs in 1489. The settlements of Pataura (an alquería featuring irrigated land) and Jolúcar (featuring mainly cattle pasture) belonged to Motril. At the turn of the 16th century, its population was still overwhelmingly Muslim, and so King Ferdinand prohibited Christians from living in Motril and ruled that those Christians who owned possessions there were to relocate to Salobreña. After the mass conversion of the population in 1500, the town subsequently featured a majority of New Christians, or Moriscos. After the Rebellion of the Alpujarras (1568–1571), most moriscos were expelled from the Kingdom of Granada as had been decreed in 1570. This exodus halved the population of Motril. Due to this, in 1573 the Crown encouraged 60 Old Christian settlers to move to the area with their families. By 1574 there were however only 56 registered settlers, accounting for 254 people (a high ratio presumably justified by the number of servants accompanying the settlers' families).

The Church of the Incarnation was built in the 16th century on the site of a mosque. The building formed part of the defences which protected the town centre, and incorporated defensive features which are still visible today.

Sugarcane was the staple crop in Motril, and after its harvest it was processed into sugar in local refineries. The most important of these was "La Casa de la Palma", the remains of which are on display at the Museo Preindustrial de la Caña de Azúcar (English: The Pre-Industrial Sugar Cane Museum).

By the end of the 1600s, the Nuestra Señora de la Cabeza church had been built.

In 1657, Philip IV granted Motril the title of city, separating its jurisdiction from Granada.

At the beginning of the next century, Philip V distinguished Motril as "Muy Noble y Leal" (Very Noble and Loyal), the motto shown on the Motril's current coat of arms.

=== 19th century ===
After the War of Independence, during which Motril was occupied by French troops, the city's sugar industry entered a new era with the introduction of steam technology for sugar production. After a few years, due to an increase in the number of sugar refineries, it became the largest producer in Granada.

During the short-lived First Spanish Republic, the cantonal rebellion took place. Various places declared themselves independent cantons including Motril between 22 and 25 July in 1873.

The most traditional ride in the city, "Las Explanadas", opened to the public in the mid-19th century.

== Monuments ==
=== Sugar cane refineries ===
Motril has long been synonymous with sugar and sugar cane. The process from sugar cane transformation into various types of sugar, even liquors like the cherished rum of Motril, has always been the basis of the local economy.

Sugar cane refineries in Motril include:

- Nuestra Señora del Pilar. This refinery is undergoing restoration as an industrial museum.
- Nuestra Señora de la Almudena.
- Azucarera de San Luis.
- Nuestra Señora de Lourdes.
- Nuestra Señora de la Cabeza (Alcoholera).
- Nuestra Señora de las Angustias (Fabriquilla).
- Azucarera de San Fernando (sólo queda la chimenea).
- Ingenio de San José, El Varadero (sólo queda una nave).

=== Individual refineries ===
==== Nuestra Señora de la Cabeza (Alcoholera) ====
The refinery is located next to the public swimming pool and the Parque de las Américas.

It has been declared of historic value by the Andalusian Government with the chimney, store, distillery and terrain protected.

===== History =====
It was founded by the Larios family in 1885, a family which founded a company based on the production of sugar and alcohol. At present, the company makes gin.

The refinery was later burned down by workers frustrated with their low salaries.

==== Nuestra Señora de las Angustias (La Fabriquilla) ====
Leaving Motril and moving towards Puntalón and La Garnatilla is the sugar refinery of Nuestra Señora de las Angustias, built in 1868. Some of its premises have been restored and are now intended for municipal usage, highlighting the magnificent "Nave de los Arcos". Juan Ramón La Chica owned two refineries called "Nuestra Señora de las Angustias", with one in Granada and the other in Motril. He gained full ownership over the latter in 1874. He also owned another sugar cane refinery called "Nuestra Señora del Carmen" in Pinos Puente, Granada.

=== Religious buildings ===
- Iglesia Mayor de la Encarnación, The Church of the Incarnation, was erected in the 16th century on the site of a mosque.
- Santuario de Nuestra Señora de la Cabeza (known as "El Cerro de la Virgen")
- Iglesia de la Divina Pastora (Capuchinos).
- Santuario de Nuestra Señora de la Victoria.
- Ermita de la Virgen del Carmen.
- Iglesia del Convento de las Nazarenas.
- Ermita de Nuestra Señora de las Angustias.
- Ermita de San Antonio de Padua.
- Ermita de San Nicolás.
- Ermita del Señor de Junes.
- Capilla del Santo Rosario

==== Santuario de Nuestra Señora de la Cabeza ====
This church is one of the most important and emblematic monuments in Motril. Located on a hill called Virgin's Hill, the church was built on the ruins of a Nasrid fortress in the 17th century by the architect Isidro de la Chica. The building was damaged during the Civil War in the 20th century and it was restored by the sculptor Manuel Gonzales, a sculptor from Motril, in the 1960s. Inside the church is the patron saint of Motril, the Virgen de la Cabeza. The church's modern day surroundings include the Parque de los Pueblos de América and the first fountain built in Motril, featuring a large Spanish flag.

== Economy ==
=== Agriculture ===
The cultivation of sugarcane was for a long time important in the countryside, but commercial growing ended in 2006. Once the cane had been harvested, it was brought to Motril's sugar refineries including:

- "Nuestra Señora del Pilar"
- "Nuestra Señora de la Almudena"
- "Azucarera de San Luis"
- "Nuestra señora de Lourdes"
- "Nuestra Señora de la Cabeza"
- "Nuestra Señora de las Angustias"
- "Azucarera de San Fernando"
- "Ingenio de San José, El Varadero"

These refineries are now abandoned.

The potato was also a significant crop. Situated on the south coast of Andalusia, Motril grows crops like avocado, custard apple, guava, mango, and banana, as well as greenhouse cultivation. Motril and the villages of its municipality, Carchuna, Calahonda, Castel de Ferro and others, live off of crops grown in greenhouses. Of these crops grown in greenhouses, tomatoes and cucumbers are the most significant although others such as custard apples, beans and peas are also grown.

=== Industry ===
Motril's geographical location makes it a commercial and industrial center. One of the essential industries in Motril besides greenhouse agriculture is the paper mill, which provides 400 jobs and produces around 250 tons of paper per year. The Port of Motril is both a commercial and fishing port.

== Climate ==
The climate in Motril is determined by two important geographic factors:

- The Sierra de Lújar blocks cold winds from the north (Granada and Sierra Nevada).
- The Mediterranean Sea, to the south, functions as a thermal regulator.

The combination of both factors allows the presence of a subtropical microclimate. The annual average temperature is between 18 and 20 degrees Celsius. Summers are hot, with high temperatures between 27 and 31 degrees and low temperatures between 18 and 22 degrees while winters are mild, with high temperatures usually over 17-18 degrees and low temperatures between 9-10 degrees. The African continent helps to cushion the hard effects of Atlantic and Mediterranean climate, providing warm breezes from the south.

Motril has a hot semi-arid climate (Köppen: BSh) with very mild winters and hot, very dry summers. On 16 July 2022, a maximum temperature of 44.5 °C (112.1 °F) was registered in Motril.

Climate data for Motril, 1981–2010
| Month | Jan | Feb | Mar | Apr | May | Jun | Jul | Aug | Sep | Oct | Nov | Dec | Year |
|---|---|---|---|---|---|---|---|---|---|---|---|---|---|
| Mean daily maximum °C (°F) | 17.6 (63.7) | 18.3 (64.9) | 20.0 (68.0) | 21.5 (70.7) | 23.7 (74.7) | 27.0 (80.6) | 29.5 (85.1) | 30.1 (86.2) | 27.4 (81.3) | 24.2 (75.6) | 20.7 (69.3) | 18.6 (65.5) | 23.2 (73.8) |
| Daily mean °C (°F) | 13.3 (55.9) | 14.1 (57.4) | 15.8 (60.4) | 17.2 (63.0) | 19.4 (66.9) | 22.7 (72.9) | 25.2 (77.4) | 25.7 (78.3) | 23.3 (73.9) | 20.0 (68.0) | 16.6 (61.9) | 14.5 (58.1) | 19.0 (66.2) |
| Mean daily minimum °C (°F) | 9.0 (48.2) | 9.9 (49.8) | 11.5 (52.7) | 12.9 (55.2) | 15.1 (59.2) | 18.4 (65.1) | 20.9 (69.6) | 21.2 (70.2) | 19.1 (66.4) | 15.8 (60.4) | 12.5 (54.5) | 10.3 (50.5) | 14.7 (58.5) |
| Average precipitation mm (inches) | 49.2 (1.94) | 40.4 (1.59) | 28.6 (1.13) | 30.8 (1.21) | 19.7 (0.78) | 6.1 (0.24) | 0.8 (0.03) | 1.9 (0.07) | 21.4 (0.84) | 46.2 (1.82) | 63.8 (2.51) | 70.0 (2.76) | 378.9 (14.92) |
| Average precipitation days (≥ 1 mm) | 5.6 | 5.3 | 4.2 | 4.9 | 2.8 | 0.9 | 0.5 | 0.6 | 2.9 | 5.5 | 5.8 | 6.4 | 45.4 |
Source: World Meteorological Organization (WMO)

== Culture ==
=== Theatre ===
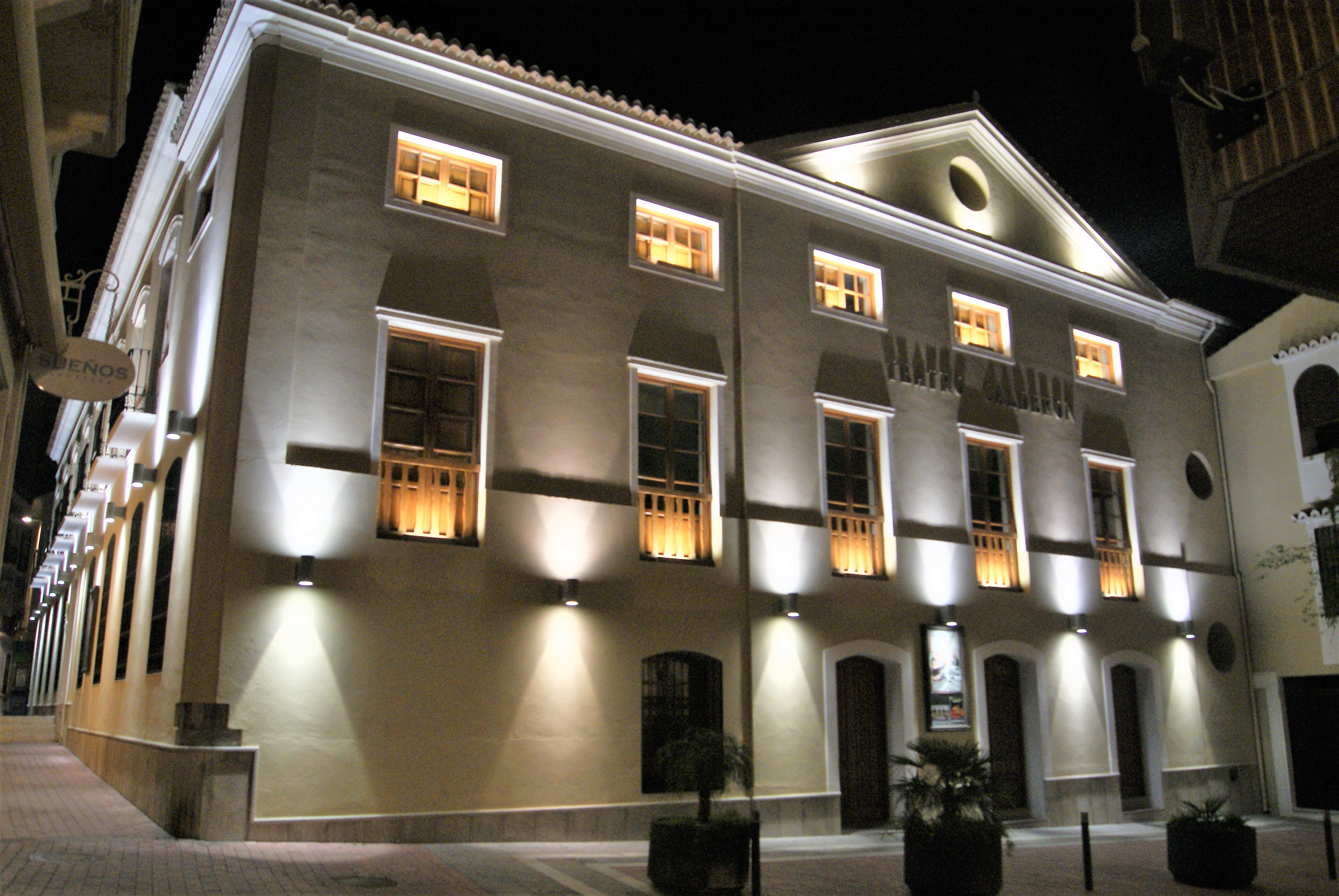
The theatre at night

There is a 19th-century theatre, the Teatro Calderón de la Barca, which is protected as a Bien de Interés Cultural. It is built in Italian style with many boxes. It organises many shows such as plays, exhibitions, concerts and monologues.

=== Music and dance ===
There is a local orchestra, the "Joven Orquesta Ciudad de Motril". In Motril, there is a strong music development. Young people study several instruments at the professional conservatory and there is a local music school too.

Flamenco is also performed here in dance academies and exhibitions along the whole year, especially in the Cruces. Flamenco is the most prominent dance style but other styles are also practised, like ballet.

Youth Area provides many activities organised by local associations that contribute to the city's leisure like video games tournaments, crafts workshops and once a year, an event called Encuentro Joven where young people and children meet and these association prepares games to pass a journey all together and meet new people. This area has a centre called the Centro Joven where expositions of young local artists draws are passed so it helps to get to know their work.

=== Holy Week ===
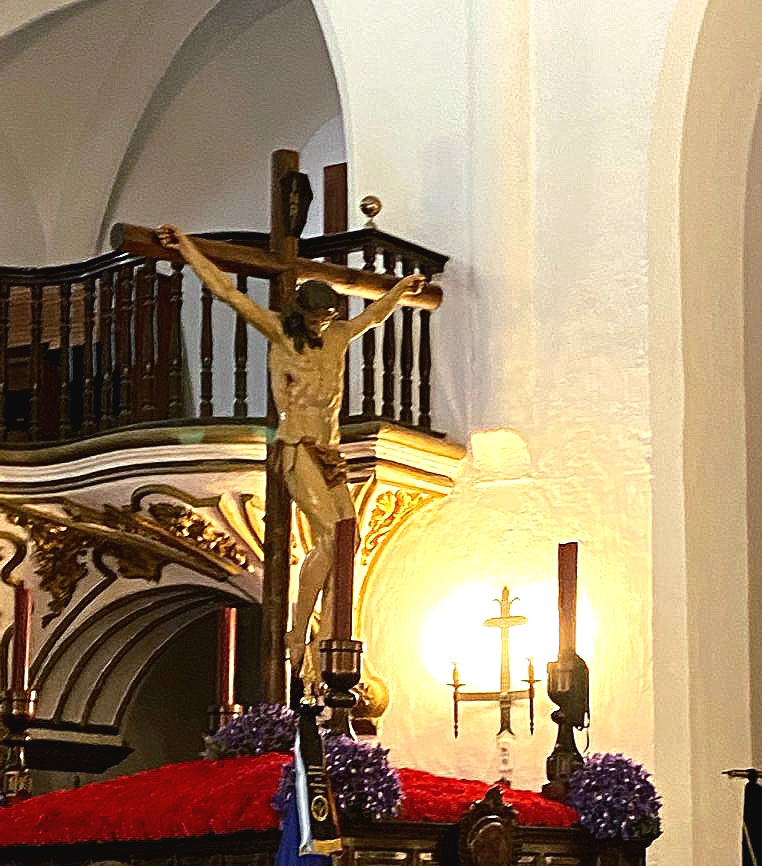
The Holiest Christ of the Good Death during the 2022 Holy Week in Motril

The Holy Week in Motril has been declared a National Tourist Interest, It consist of 12 brotherhood, 23 pasos and more than 6000 followers. There are processions every day. The Holy Week in Motril started in 1600 with the eldest brotherhood, called Vera Cruz. After the Spanish Civil War every brotherhood had to restore its patrimony.

Almost all the statues in Motril are made by some artists from the province of Granada. Processions of note include:

- The starting procession is on Palm Sunday. In this procession we can see two different pasos.
- On Easter Sunday there is a procession called "Dulce Nombre de Jesus". It consists on a group of children carrying the statue. It is accompanied by a lot of little children carrying bells.

Nowadays, the members of the brotherhood accompany the image with special clothes that cover their face.

In Spain there is a tradition of not to eat meat on Holy Thursday and on Good Friday. Each city has their own stew. The typical menu in Motril is the stew made with chickpeas and cod, the cod with tomato, and some cod omelette. Also, there are different desserts like rice pudding, torrija ... In these days it's common meeting the family.

=== Cuisine ===
The most popular dish from Motril is migas (crumbs), made of bread. Fish is also very popular in Motril, due to the town's important fisheries. The most popular fish are anchovy (locally named boquerón), sardines and shrimp. The most famous drink, exclusive to the area, is ron pálido which is a locally produced rum.

== Leisure ==
=== Beaches ===
Motril is within the Costa Tropical, a large tourist region on the coast. Motril has small beaches (bays) and large beaches (like Playa Granada). They are popular during the summer with people from the surrounding as well as the interior regions.

Beaches in the area include Playa de Poniente (a large gravel/shingle beach), Playa Granada (shingles), Playa Carchuna (gravel and pebbles), and Playa Calahonda (gravel). Many of the area's beaches include car parking facilities, first aid stands, showers, beach cleaning, bars and restaurants, typical beach facilities (such as beach umbrellas and hammocks) and S.O.S. telephones.

== Transport ==
Motril is served by autovías A-7 to Málaga and Almería, and A-44 to Granada. The Port of Motril offers ferries to Melilla, Nador, Tanger-Med, and Al-Hoceima and shipped 2.8 million tonnes of cargo in 2019. Motril is the only Spanish Mediterranean port that lacks a rail service; building a line which would take 25 minutes to travel to Granada railway station was estimated to cost €400 million in 2017. The link to Granada was rejected in 2010 by the Ministry of Development on the basis of being unsuitable for freight railway transport due to the steep slope. From 1925 to 1950, Motril was connected to Granada by means of a cable way that spanned from Motril to Dúrcal.

== Time capsule ==
On 22 July 2008, a second time capsule in Spain was buried as part of an official event organized to commemorate the 135th anniversary of the cantonal movement in Motril, which began on 22 July 1873, and ended on 25 March. The president of the canton was Ruperto Vidaurreta de la Camara. This time capsule will be opened on 22 July 2023, to celebrate the 150th anniversary of this event. It is located at coordinates 36°45′03″N 3°30′44″W.

== Festivities ==
January 13 – Earthquake Day
Its story is particularly tragic: On 13 January 1804 there was a very strong earthquake which had devastating effects: it caused the partial destruction of the city and the death of two people. Currently it recalls a vote conducted by the neighborhood because of the misfortunes suffered by hundreds of families during these disastrous years.
February 28 – Día de Andalucía
This day, Andalusia's flag is hoisted at Puchilla's roundabout and the Andalusian anthem is sung. On this day there are numerous acts of civil and military authorities. A popular race is also celebrated in which the runners go from the square of the "Explanadas" to the fire station in the port. After this race there are numerous sports-related activities.
May 3 – Festivities of "Las Cruces"
Motril is considered the second most famous city of "Las Cruces", after Córdoba. It's an important festivity considered National Tourist Interest. During the three days of celebration there are several types of singing and dancing shows. There are carriages decorated with traditional objects of the popular culture around the town and in some special squares neighbours make big crosses decorated with flowers. The most typical clothing for this day is the flamenco outfit.
June 13 – Romería de San Antonio
It is celebrated on 13 June and it is celebrated in the north of Motril, in the neighbourhood where there is the old chapel of the Saint. The neighbourhood helps with the organization of this event.
June 24 – San Juan
Bonfires are lit on the beach, and people are allowed to camp, there is a tradition by which you throw three wishes written on a piece of paper into the fire and throw three negatives ideas into the sea for the tide to take them.
July 16 – Festivities of "La Virgen del Carmen", on the port.
These are the festivities of the neighbourhood "El Varadero", on Motril's port. There, a mass in the "Lonja Pesquera" is celebrated and fishermen sing a Salve Mariner. At sunset, after a procession in the streets, the virgin is boarded and leaves from the port followed by all the fleet, decorated for the events. In this festivity show fireworks.
August 15 – Patronal festivities of Motril
In the first half of August the patronal festivities of Motril in honour of the "Virgen de la Cabeza" are celebrated. On these weeks, different events are celebrated in the "Ferial del Cortijo del Conde", with some concerts, night fair, dances, sport shows, fireworks with music on the beach, morning fair ... On the 15th, the Virgin goes through the city streets.
October
These two popular neighbourhoods of Motril celebrate their patronal celebrations during the month of October. Both the "Virgen de Las Angustias" and the "Virgen de la Pastora" leave their churches and they go all over the neighbourhoods with the fervour of their neighbours.

== Sister cities ==
- Albardón, Argentina
- Marple, United Kingdom
- Melilla, Spain
- Agounit, Sahrawi Arab Democratic Republic
- Smolyan, Bulgaria

== Sports ==
The town has a football team, CF Motril.

== Notable people ==
- Catalina of Motril (fl. 1501–1531), enslaved bedchamber servant of Catherine of Aragon during her marriage to Henry VIII.
- Baudouin of Belgium died in Motril in 1993
- José Callejón (born 1987), professional footballer.

== See also ==
- List of municipalities in Granada

== Bibliography ==
- Malpica Cuello, Antonio (1983). "La villa de Motril y la repoblación de la costa de Granada (1489–1510)" (PDF). Cuadernos de Estudios Medievales y Ciencias y Técnicas Historiográficas. 10–11: 169–206.
- Rodríguez Gálvez, Jesús (2021). "El repartimiento y la población de Motril a finales del siglo XVI: ¿éxito o fracaso?" (PDF). : Los Fernández de Córdoba: nobleza, hegemonía y fama: segundo congreso: homenaje a Miguel Ángel Ladero Quesada. pp. 695–704. ISBN 978-84-17592-15-8.
