= María Jesús Rubiera Mata =

Spanish historian

María Jesús Rubiera Mata (1942, in Madrid – 7 June 2009, in Alicante) was a Spanish historian specialising in the history of Islamic Spain. She started teaching at the University Complutense in 1966. She moved to the University of Alicante in 1982, and in 1985 she became the Chair of Arab and Islamic Studies there. She was married to Mikel de Epalza who was also a historian of Islamic Spain at the same university. They both founded the journal Sharq al-Andalus dealing with Islamic and Arabic History in the West, especially the Iberian Peninsula. She died on 7 June 2009 due to a chronic disease.
