= Timeline of the Muslim presence in the Iberian Peninsula =

Listing of events in Spanish history

This is a timeline of notable events during the period of Muslim presence in Iberia, starting with the Umayyad conquest in the 8th century till after the fall of last independent Muslim state, Granada.

== Conquest (711–756) ==
- 711 – A Muslim force consisting of Arabs and Berbers of about 7,000 soldiers under general Tariq ibn Ziyad, loyal to the Umayyad Caliph Al-Walid I, enters the Iberian peninsula from North Africa.
  - At the Battle of Guadalete, Tariq ibn Ziyad defeats Visigothic king Roderic.
- 712 – The Muslim governor of Northern Africa, Musa ibn Nusayr, follows Tariq ibn Ziyad with an army of 5,000 Arabs to make the total of the army 18,000. He takes Medina-Sidonia, Seville and Mértola.
- 713 – Abd al-Aziz ibn Musa, Musa's son, takes Jaén, Murcia, Granada, Sagunto.
- 714 – First Umayyad campaigns in the lower Ebro valley and southeastern Iberian Peninsula.
  - Abd al-Aziz takes Évora, Santarém and Coimbra.
- 715 – Musa and Tariq leave for Damascus at Al-Walid's orders, and Abd al-Aziz is left in charge, who makes Seville his capital. Al-Walid I dies, and his successor Sulayman ibn Abd al-Malik orders Abd al-Aziz ibn Musa assassinated.
- 717 – Córdoba becomes the capital of Al-Andalus.
- 717: Umayyad armies under Al-Hurr ibn Abd al-Rahman al-Thaqafi cross the Pyrenees for the first time on a reconnaissance mission.
- 718 – Pelagius, a Christian Asturian noble and possibly a comrade-in-arms of King Roderic at the Battle of Guadalete, leads the fight against the Umayyads in Asturias.
- 719 – The Umayyad governor Al-Samh crosses the Pyrenees and conquers Arbūna (Narbonne), or in the following year (720).
- 720 – Al-Samh sets up his capital at Narbonne. He offers the still largely Arian inhabitants generous terms.
- 721 – A combined force of Aquitanians and Franks under Duke Odo the Great defeat an Umayyad army at the Battle of Toulouse.
- 720's – Arab forces soundly based in Narbonne and easily resupplied by sea, started raids.
- 731 – Berbers allied with Odo rebel in Cerdanya, but the rebellion is suppressed by Abd al-Rahman al-Ghafiqi.
- 732 – Abd al-Rahman al-Ghafiqi defeats an Aquitanian force under Odo on the Garonne next to Bordeaux.
  - Frankish commander Charles Martel and Odo defeat an Umayyad army at the Battle of Tours, killing Abd al-Rahman al-Ghafiqi.
- 735 – Umayyads take Arles in the Rhône Valley.
- 739 – The Berber revolt begins in the Maghreb and expands to Al-Andalus.
  - Rebels in North Africa defeat a Syrian force and kill its commander Kulthum.
  - Revolt drives Muslim army out of Galicia.
- 740 – Berbers rebel against the ethnically exclusive Arab Umayyad Caliphate and refuse to support them with tax revenues.
- 741 – The 10,000 survivors of Kulthum's force arrive in Iberia under a new leader, Talaba ibn Salama.
- 742 – Internal conflict in Al-Andalus continues for the next 4 years.
- 755 – Abd al-Rahman I, a grandson of caliph Hisham, flees to Al-Andalus to escape the Abbasids.

== Emirate of Córdoba (756–929) ==
- 756 – Abd al-Rahman I defeats Yusuf al-Fihri outside Córdoba, and proclaims himself Emir.
- 759 – The Andalusians lose Narbonne, the last Muslim stronghold north of the Pyrenees.
- 764 – Abd al-Rahman I takes Toledo from Hisham ibn Urwa.
- 766 – Said al-Matari rebels in Seville.
- 771 – Syrians under Abd al-Ghaffar rebel against Abd al-Rahman I.
- 774 – Abd al-Rahman I defeats the Syrian rebels near the river Bembezar.
- 777 – Abd al-Rahman I suppresses an Abbasid-inspired revolt.
- 778 – The Franks under Charlemagne attack Zaragoza, but are forced to withdraw empty-handed.
- 785 – Construction of the Great Mosque of Córdoba begins on the grounds of a Visigothic church.
- 788 – Abd al-Rahman I dies and is succeeded by his son Hisham I.
- 791 – Alfonso II becomes King of Asturias in Oviedo and takes a number of Andalusian strongholds and settles the lands south of the Douro River.
- 791 – A Córdoban army defeats the Asturians at the Battle of the Burbia River.
  - A Muslim force raids into Galicia.
- 792 – Hisham I calls for a Jihad against the Christians in the Marca Hispanica and Gothia (eastern Pyrenees).
- 794 – Asturians defeat the Córdoban armies at the Battle of Lutos.
- 795 – A Córdoban force occupies Astorga.
- 796 – Hisham I dies and his son Al-Hakam I becomes Emir.
- 798 – In a raid across western Al-Andalus, Alfonso II of Asturias captures and sacks Lisbon, but does not retain it.
- 799 – Basques revolt and kill Mutarrif ibn-Musa, the Córdoban governor of Pamplona.
- 800 – Charlemagne takes Barcelona. He is granted the title of "Holy Roman Emperor" by Pope Leo III in order to guarantee his protection of Rome against the invading Lombards.
- 801 – William of Gellone and Louis the Pious, Charlemagne's son, take Barcelona from Andalusian lords.
- 806 – Frankish conquest of Pamplona.
- 808 – Franks fail to take Tortosa.
- 809 – An Umayyad prince defeats and executes Tumlus, a Muslim rebel who had seized power in Lisbon some years before.
- 811 – Charlemagne fails to take control of Tarragona; the Spanish March is established south of Barcelona.
- 813 – The tomb of James the Apostle is 'revealed' near Santiago de Compostela in Galicia.
- 816 – Forces of the Emirate of Córdoba under Abd al-Karim ibn Abd al-Wahid defeat a force loyal to the Kingdom of Francia under Balask al-Yalasqi.
- 822 – Abd al-Rahman II becomes Emir of Córdoba.
- 824 – Basques destroy a Carolingian army at the second Battle of Roncesvalles. Kingdom of Pamplona is established.
- 825 – Andalusian forces attempt to invade Christian territory from Coimbra and Viseu but are driven back.
- 827 – Bernard of Septimania holds Barcelona against Gothic rebels aided by Córdoba.
- 829 – An insurrection against Córdoba takes place in Mérida.
- 839 – Alfonso II of Asturias commands a military force in the region of Viseu.
- 844 – Vikings raid the Galician estuaries, are defeated by Ramiro I, attack Lisbon, and sack Seville, but are wiped out by a Córdoban relief force.
  - Battle of Clavijo, a mythical battle between Christians led by Ramiro I of Asturias and Muslims, where St. James is claimed to have aided the Christians.
- 848 – William, son of Bernard of Septimania, seizes Barcelona.
- 850–859 – Perfectus, a Christian priest in Córdoba, is beheaded after refusing to retract numerous insults hurled at Muhammad. Numerous other priests, monks, and laity would follow.
  - The Martyrs of Córdoba, forty-eight Christian men and women, are decapitated for refusing to convert or recurrently blaspheming Muhammad.
- 852 – Abd al-Rahman II dies, and is succeeded by his son Muhammad I.
- 854 – Afonso Betotes takes Tui.
- 859 – Vikings raid the Iberian coast, and capture and ransom King García Íñiguez of Pamplona.
- 859 – Ordoño I of Asturias defeats Musa ibn Musa at Albelda.
- 868 – Vímara Peres captures Porto and establishes the County of Portugal.
- 872 – Count Odoario captures Chaves
- 873 – Wilfred the Hairy, Count of Barcelona, sets up a Christian principality with a certain degree of independence from the Frankish kings.
- 878 – The city of Coimbra is taken from the Moors. Hermenegildo Gutiérrez is made Count of Coimbra.
- 886 – Muhammad I dies and his son Al-Mundhir becomes Emir.
- 888 – Al-Mundhir dies besieging the rebel stronghold of Bobastro. His brother Abdallah succeeds him.
- 893 – Zamora is taken for Alfonso III of Asturias.
- 899 – Simancas is taken for Alfonso III of Asturias.
- 900 – Toro is taken for Alfonso III of Asturias.
- 905 – Sancho I of Pamplona usurps the Basque kingdom of Pamplona with the help of Alfonso III of León, Raymond I, Count of Pallars and Ribagorza and the Banu Qasi.
- 912 – Abdullah dies and his grandson Abd al-Rahman III becomes the Emir. Osma is taken for the Christians.
- 913 – An expedition commanded by Ordoño II of León takes Talavera from the Muslims.
  - The capital city of the Kingdom of Asturias is moved from Oviedo to León, becomes Kingdom of León.
- 916 – Ordoño II of León is defeated by Abd al-Rahman III in Valdejunquera.
- 917 – Ordoño II defeats Abd al-Rahman III at the Battle of San Esteban de Gormaz.
- 919 – The Muslims attack San Esteban de Gormaz.
  - Pope John X recognizes the orthodoxy and legitimacy of the Visigothic Liturgy maintained in the Mozarabic rite.
- 920 – Abd al-Rahman III defeat the armies of the Kingdom of León at Battle of Valdejunquera.
- 920 – Abd al-Rahman III's forces take San Esteban de Gormaz after a battle
- 920 – Muslim forces cross the Pyrenees, enter Gascony, and reach as far as Toulouse. The garrison of Muez is killed.
- 924 – The city of Pamplona is destroyed by Abd al-Rahman III.

== Caliphate of Córdoba (929–1009) ==
- 929 – Abd al-Rahman III, faced with the threat of invasion by the Fatimids, proclaims himself Caliph.
- 930 – Ramiro II of León defeats Abd al-Rahman III at Simancas, Osma, and Talavera.
- 933 – Battle of Osma where Castilian–Leónese troops, under Fernán González of Castile, defeat the Muslim army of Abd al-Rahman III.
- 939 – Ramiro II of León defeats Abd al-Rahman III at the Battle of Simancas. He is defeated again at Alhandega.
  - Madrid is captured from Córdobans. At the ditch of Simancas (Shant Mankus), Ramiro II inflicts a heavy defeat on Abd al-Rahman III, who narrowly escapes with his life, and never takes personal charge of another expedition.
- 940 – Madrid is recaptured by Córdobans.
- 953 – Emperor Otto I sends an embassy to Córdoba to ask Abd al-Rahman III to call off Muslim raiders who had set themselves up in Alpine passes and are attacking merchant caravans going in and out of Italy.
- 955 – Ordoño III of León attacks Lisbon.
- 961 – Abd al-Rahman III dies. His son Al-Hakam II becomes Caliph.
- 974 – A Córdoban expedition under Ibn Tumlus crushes a rebellion in Seville.
- 976 – Al-Hakam II dies and is succeeded by his young and only son, Hisham II. The Chamberlain Al-Mansur holds de facto power, and launches several campaigns against the Christians, going as north as Barcelona and sacking it.
- 978 – Leonese forces under García Fernández and Ramiro III of León suffer the worst in a string of defeats at San Esteban de Gormaz, Rueda and Torrevicente. The Galician nobles revolt forcing Ramiro to abdicate in favor of Bermudo II of León.
- 981 – Al-Mansur and his ally Man ibn Abd al-Aziz al-Tujib defeats Ghalib ibn Abd al-Rahman and count García Fernandez near Atienza. Ghalib is killed in the battle, and Al-Mansur subsequently has al-Tujibi executed.
  - 981 – Ramiro III of León is defeated by Al-Mansur at the Battle of Rueda and agrees to pay tribute to the caliph of Córdoba.
- 983 – After a failed rebellion in the Maghreb against his family, Zawi ibn Ziri, offers his troops to Al-Mansur, but is not allowed to cross the straits of Gibraltar for many years .
- 985 – Al-Mansur sacks Barcelona again.
- 986 – Al-Mansur burns down the monastery of Sant Cugat del Vallès.
- 987 – Al-Mansur retakes Coimbra, and seizes castles north of the Douro River, and burns Santiago de Compostela to the ground. The doors and bells of the city's Basilica are taken to the Mosque in Córdoba, while the rest of the church is destroyed.
- 988 – Al-Mansur sacks León, Zamora, and Sahagun, and sets fire to the monasteries of Eslonza and Sahagun.
- 989 – Al-Mansur seizes Osma.
- 995 – Despite stout resistance by the Beni-Gomez clan, the Christian counts of Saldaña, Liébana, Carrión, and Zamora, Al-Mansur destroys their capital, Santa Maria de Carrion.
- 998 – Wadih al-Siqlabi, a Slavic slave-soldier of Al-Mansur, crosses the straits of Gibraltar and captures Fez.
  - Muslims briefly attempt to establish a garrison at Zamora.
- 1000 – Sancho III of Navarre inflicts major losses on Moors and nearly clinches a remarkable victory.
- 1000 – Sancho III of Navarre gains control of Aragon and Castile, uniting the three kingdoms.
- 1035 – On his death, Sancho III, splits his kingdom and leaves Navarre to his son García III, Castile to Fernando I, and Aragon to Ramiro I.
- 1002 – Al-Mansur raids into La Rioja, and soon after dies in the village of Salem.
- 1002 – Al-Mansur's son Al-Muzaffar takes over his position, and begins annual raids against the Christians.
- 1003 – Moors sack León.
- 1008 – Al-Muzaffar dies and is succeed by his brother, Abd al-Rahman Sanchuelo.
- 1009 – Muhammad II, a great-grandson of Abd al-Rahman III, usurps Hisham II and destroys the palace complex of Madinat al-Zahira near Córdoba.

== Political fragmentation (1009–1094) ==
- 1009 – León is sacked by Moors again.
  - Muhammad II expels Berber soldiers from Córdoba. They set up camp at Calatrava and proclaim another great-grandson of Abd al-Rahman III, Sulayman, as Caliph.
  - Sulayman, allied with Count Sancho García of Castile, defeats and Muhammad II and captures Córdoba.
  - Sulayman restores Hisham II to the throne, before taking power himself as caliph.
  - Taifa of Badajoz becomes independent and governs the territory between Coimbra and North Alentejo.
- 1010 – Muhammed II flees to Toledo and seeks the aid of Ramon Borrell, Count of Barcelona and Urgel.
  - The Catalan army defeats Sulayman's Berber forces at Aqabat al-Bakr, and Muhammad II reclaims Córdoba while Sulayman flees.
  - Muhammad II, attempting to flee a coup, is arrested and executed by his vizier Wadih after his armies are defeated by Sulayman at Guadiaro.
  - Hisham II is restored as Caliph by Wadih, but retains de facto power.
  - Sulayman's Berber forces begin their siege of Córdoba.
- 1013 – Córdoba falls to Sulayman's Berber army, and Hisham II is killed or disappears.
  - Sulayman hands out provincial governorships to the Berber chiefs as a reward.
  - Jews are expelled from Córdoba, and many flee to Granada, where Samuel ibn Naghrillah and his son Joseph ibn Naghrela become vizier.
- 1014 – Chief of Sanhaja Berbers, Zawi ibn Ziri, takes over Granada.
- 1015 – The Emir of Denia, Mujahid al-Amiri, sets out from his base in the Balearic Islands with a fleet of 125 ships in an attempt to take Sardinia.
  - Ali ibn Hammud, the Emir of Ceuta, marches on Córdoba claiming to act on behalf of Hisham II.
  - Ali ibn Hammud captures Córdoba, and Sulayman is executed for killing Hisham II. Ali ibn Hammud is proclaimed caliph.
  - Mujahid al-Amiri is dislodged from Sardinia by a force from Genoa and Pisa.
- 1018 – Ali ibn Hammud is assassinated in Córdoba, and his brother Al-Qasim takes over.
  - Umayyad loyalists proclaim Abd al-Rahman IV as caliph. He is soon defeated and killed in battle by the Zirids of Granada.
  - Taifa of Algarve becomes independent.
- 1021 – Yahya, the son of Ali ibn Hammud, rebels in Málaga against Al-Qasim's assumption of power.
  - Yahya captures Córdoba as Al-Qasim flees, and is proclaimed caliph.
- 1022 – Taifa of Lisbon becomes independent.
- 1023 – Al-Qasim retakes Córdoba as Yahya leaves for Málaga, but is soon expelled by the citizens who install Abd al-Rahman V as caliph.
- 1024 – Abd al-Rahman V is deposed and killed by Córdobans, who then proclaim Muhammad III Caliph.
  - Taifa of Seville becomes independent under its Abbadid emir, Muhammad ibn Abbad.
- 1027 – The citizens of Córdoba proclaim Hisham III Caliph.
- 1028 – Alfonso V, king of Asturias and León, lays siege to Viseu but is killed by a bolt from the walls.
- 1031 – Hisham III is deposed and exiled after revolts due to an unpopular rule. The Umayyad caliphate of Córdoba falls.
- 1033 – Taifa of Mértola becomes independent.
- 1034 – The Leonese destroy a raiding force under the emir of Seville, Ismail ibn Abbad, who flees to Lisbon.
  - Gonçalo Trastemires, a Portuguese frontiersman, captures Montemor castle on the Mondego river.
  - Over the next 28 years Ferdinand I of León takes Coimbra and obliges the Muslims of Toledo, Seville, and Badajoz to pay him tribute. Before his death, he divides his territories between his sons: Castile goes to Sancho II, León to Alfonso VI of León and Castile and Galicia to Garcia II.
- 1035 – Bermudo III of León defeats the Moors at the Battle of Cesar, in the Aveiro region.
- 1038 – Granada's armies wage continuous war against their Muslim neighbors, primarily Seville.
- 1040 – Taifa of Silves becomes independent.
- 1043 – Zaragoza and Toledo fight over the border city of Guadalajara. Toledo pays the Navarrese to raid into Zaragoza; similarly, Zaragoza pays the León–Castilians to raid into Toledo. The Christian armies ravage the respective Muslim lands unchecked.
  - Rodrigo Diaz Vivar, whom the Muslims would name "El Cid Campeador" (Lord Winner of Battles) is born in Burgos.
- 1044 – Abbad III al-Mu'tamid, son of the Abbadid Emir of Seville Abbad II al-Mu'tadid, retakes Mértola, since 1033 an independent Taifa.
- 1051 – Yusuf ibn Hud, the Banu Hud Emir of Lleida, is paying the Catalans to protect against his own family in Zaragoza.
  - The Taifa of the Algarve is annexed by the Taifa of Seville.
- 1053 – Emir Al-Mutadid of Seville drives Berbers from Arcos, Morón and Ronda.
- 1054 – Ferdinand I of Castile defeats his brother García III of Navarra at the Battle of Atapuerca. Garcia is killed and his son Sancho is proclaimed King on the battlefield.
- 1055 – Emir Al-Mutadid of Seville expels Berbers from Algeciras.
- 1057 – Ferdinand I of Castile-León captures Lamego.
- 1058 – Emir Al-Muzaffar al-Aftas pays the Christians to leave Badajoz, but not before Ferdinand I of Castile-León takes Viseu.
- 1060–1063 – Council (Ecumenical Synod) of Santiago de Compostela.
- 1060 – Barghawata Berbers set up a Taifa in Ceuta, but are eventually crushed by the Almoravids.
  - Ferdinand I of León imposes an annual tribute on the Taifa of Zaragoza. Emir Al-Muqtadir ibn Hud of Zaragoza drives Slavs from Tortosa when the Tortosans rise against their Slav ruler.
- 1062 – Ferdinand I of Castile-León invades Taifas of Toledo and Badajoz, and forces them to pay tribute.
- 1063 – Battle of Graus. During spring, Ramiro I of Aragon besieges Muslim Graus in Zaragozan territory. The Emir Ahmad al-Muqtadir of Zaragoza leads his army north accompanied by a Castilian contingent under Prince Sancho (the future Sancho II). Rodrigo Díaz de Vivar later known as El Cid is probably in the Castilian contingent. The opposing armies meet and after a protracted struggle Ramiro I is killed and the Aragonese flee (8 May 1063). Pope Alexander II sends an international force to Spain under his standard bearer William of Montreuil. It includes Italian knights, Normans (Robert Crespin, Baron of Lower Normandy), Frenchmen (William, Count of Poitiers and Duke of Aquitaine), and Iberians (Bishop of Vic; Count Ermengol II of Urgel). At the start of July the expedition besieges Barbastro in the Muslim Kingdom of Lleida. The Emir of Lleida (the brother of Ahmad al-Muqtadir of Zaragoza) makes no attempt to relieve the siege and after 40 days the defenders are forced to surrender when a large stone falls from the walls and blocks the only water supply. 50,000 inhabitants are massacred or enslaved. Count Ermengol II of Urgel is left as governor on behalf of Sancho Ramirez of Aragon. Seville feels obliged to pay Christians tribute.
  - The Taifa of Seville annexes the Taifa of Silves.
- 1064 – Ferdinand I of León-Castile besieges Muslim Coimbra from 20 January 1064 – 9 July 1064. The Muslim governor who surrendered is allowed to leave with his family, but 5,000 inhabitants are taken captive, and all Muslims are forced out of Portuguese territory across the Mondego river.
  - The Mozarabic (Christian) general Sisnando Davides, who led the siege of Coimbra, becomes Count of Coimbra.
  - The Hispanic calendar is adopted.
- 1065 – Civil War in Castile-León. In April Emir Ahmad al-Muqtadir of Zaragoza, aided by 500 Sevillian knights, besieges Barbastro. The governor, Count Ermengol II of Urgel, is killed in a sortie, and a few days later the city falls, whereupon the Iberian and French garrison is put to the sword, thus bringing an end to Pope Alexander II's prototype crusade. At around the same time Emir Ahmad al-Muqtadir breaks off relationships with Castile, and Ferdinand I leads a punitive expedition into Zaragoza – taking Alquezar – and then into Valencia. Despite him being a tributary of Castile, Emir Mamun of Toledo leads to force in support of his son-in-law Emir Abd al-Malik. Mamun subsequently dethrones Abd al-Malik and incorporates Valencia into the Kingdom of Toledo. Ferdinand falls dangerously ill and retires from the field. King Ferdinand dies in León on 28 December 1065, and his empire is divided between his three sons: Sancho II in Castile, Alfonso VI in León, and Garcia in Galicia.
- 1066 – Joseph ibn Naghrela, son of the Jewish Vizier Samuel ibn Naghrela Ha-Nagid, invites Al-Mutasim of Almería to come and rule in Granada. The Zirids of Sanhaja defeat the attempt and instigate a pogrom of the Jews in Granada.
  - Joseph and other Jews in Granada are attacked and murdered; many escapees flee to the north. "More than 1,500 Jewish families, numbering 4,000 persons, fell in one day, December 30, 1066."
- 1067 – The Castilian army under Sancho II and the Alferez Rodrigo Díaz de Vivar – already known as El Cid by this time – besiege Zaragoza. The siege is lifted after Emir Ahmad al-Muqtadir pays a large ransom and promises tribute. War of the three Sanchos: Castile versus Aragon and Navarre. Aragon severely mauls the Castilians at Viana, however status quo is restored when the Zaragozan Wali of Huesca invades Aragon from the south.
- 1068 – Alfonso VI of León leads a campaign against Badajoz, but withdraws when Emir Mamun ibn Dhi-I-Nun of Toledo intercedes. Badajoz becomes tributary to León. Later the Emir of Badajoz dies and his two sons dispute the succession.
- 1069 – Alfonso VI of León overruns Badajoz early in the year. Seville takes Córdoba. The army consists of an advance guard of 300 horses and a main body of 1000.
- 1071 – Battle of Pedroso (between Braga and the River Cávado) where Garcia II of Galicia suppresses the rebellion of his Portuguese subjects under Count Nuno Mendes, last count of Portugal of the Vímara Peres House. Count Nuno Mendes is killed and Garcia II of Galicia proclaims himself King of Portugal. Sometime after 18 January 1071 and before May, Garcia II of Galicia is captured by his brother Sancho II of Castile (It is unclear if Garcia was captured in open battle at Santarém or by trickery). Garcia purchases his release and retires to the court of his tributary Al-Mutamid of Seville. Galicia is divided between his brothers Sancho and Alfonso.
- 1073 – The Emir of Granada rejects the Castilian demand for tribute, however, Abbad III al-Mu'tamid, the Emir of Seville offers to pay instead. Consequently, a joint Muslim-Castilian force builds the fortress of Belillos, from which the garrison raid into Granada.
- 1074 – Emir Al-Mutamid of Seville drives the Almoravids from Jaén.
- 1075 – Toledo takes Córdoba from Seville with the help of Castilian troops.
- 1076 – Emir Ahmad al-Muqtadir drives Slavs from Denia. Ferdinand I of León-Castile besieges Muslims and takes Coria in Badajoz. After the Emir of Toledo dies, Seville takes Córdoba back from his son al-Qadir.
- 1078 – Ibn Ammar acquires Murcia nominally on behalf of Seville but in reality as his own. Seville takes Valencia from Toledo. As a result, Al-Qadir of Toledo is forced from the city by a coup and his opponents acknowledge al-Mutawwakil of Badajoz as their new ruler. The Almoravids take Tangier. Ceuta hangs on as the last Zanata outpost because its fleet can supply it from sea.
- 1079 – Battle of Cabra. Rodrigo Díaz, defeats the Emir Abd Allah of Granada, who was helped by the Castilian Count García Ordíñez.
- Battle of Coria. Alfonso VI (already king of Castile and León) defeats the Muslim Emir of Badajoz, Al-Mutawwakkil. Al-Mutawwakkil renounces control of Toledo and al-Qadir is reinstated. A Leonese garrison is established at Zorita to the east of Toledo.
- 1080 – Ibn Ammar forced to flee Murcia.
- 1081 – El Cid, now a mercenary because he had been exiled by Alfonso IV of Castile, enters the service of the Moorish king of the northeast Spanish city of Zaragosa, al-Mu'tamin, and would remain there for his successor, al-Mu'tamin II.
- 1082 – Battle of Almenar. Rodrigo Díaz de Vivar, leading the army of Al-Mutamin of Zaragoza, defeats a combined army of the kings of Valencia (Al-Mundhir), Lleida (Al-Hayib), Aragon (Sancho Ramírez), and the Count of Barcelona (Berenguer Ramón II, who is captured). When Emir Al-Mutamid of Seville pays his tribute in debased coinage, Alfonso of León-Castile leads an expedition in Muslim territory.
- 1083 – In June–July Almoravids take Ceuta – the last outpost of the Zanata – and put to death the ruler, al-Muizz ibn Badis. Ships from Seville may have aided the attack. The same summer Alfonso of León-Castile reaches Tarifa overlooking the Straits of Gibraltar. Castile under Alfonso VI of León and Castile takes Madrid.
- 1084 – The Muslim army of Zaragoza under El Cid defeats the Aragonese. In autumn the Castilians start a loose siege of Toledo.
- 1085 – Christians take Salamanca.
  - Castile under Alfonso VI of León and Castile, Emperor of all Spains, takes Toledo.
- 1086 – Several Muslim Emirs (namely Abbad III al-Mu'tamid) ask the Almoravid leader Yusuf ibn Tashfin for help against Alfonso VI of León and Castile. In this year Yusuf ibn Tashfin passed the straits to Algeciras and inflicted a severe defeat on the Christians at the Battle of az-Zallaqah (North of Badajoz). He was debarred from following up his victory by trouble in North Africa which he had to settle in person.
  - Raymond of Burgundy, son of William I, Count of Burgundy, comes to Iberia for the 1st time to fight against the Moors, bringing with him his younger cousin Henry of Burgundy, grandson of Robert I, Duke of Burgundy.
  - In spring the Castilians besiege Zaragoza, but the siege is called off when the Almoravids land in the south. In June the Almoravids advance guard of 500 men take possession of Algeciras. The remaining 12–20,000 soon follow. Castilians under Alvar Fañez install al-Qadir as Emir of Valencia.
  - Almoravids, rampage through parts of Iberia, especially Granada and Lucena. There are persecutions and massacres. The wealthier Jews flee to Christian-held Iberia.
  - The Christian advance obliges the Muslim kings of Granada, Seville and Badajoz to call to their aid the Almoravids.
  - Battle of az-Zallaqah: At Sagrajas (Friday 23 October 1086) north-east of Badajoz, the Almoravids (12,000 or 20,000 men) under Yusuf ibn Tashfin and Andalusians (including Kings of Seville, Granada, Málaga, and Badajoz) defeat a predominantly Leonese-Castilian army (possibly 50–60,000 men including Jews, Aragonese, Italian and French) under Alfonso VI of León and Castile. The Andalusians encamp separately from the Almoravids. The Christian vanguard (Alvar Fañez) surprise the Andalusian camp before dawn; the men of Seville (Al-Mutamid) hold firm but the remaining Andalusians are chased off by the Aragonese cavalry. The Christian main body then attacks the Almoravids, but are held by the Lamtuma, and then withdraw to their own camp in response to an outflanking move by ibn Tashufin. The Aragonese return to the field, do not like what they see, and start a withdraw which turns to a rout. The Andalusians rally, and the Muslims drive Alfonso to a small hill. Alfonso and 500 knights escape in the night to Toledo. Al-Mutamid proposes that the Christians are pursued and crushed, but Ibn Tashufin retires back to his African domains leaving only 3,000 troops to defend the east of Al-Andalus. Al-Mutamid and the Almoravid generals Sir ibn Abi Bakr and Dawud ibn Aisha are reported to have fought well during the battle.
- 1087 – Alfonso VI of León and Castile takes the fortress of Aledo in the territory of Murcia, blocking the route from Seville and Granada to the eastern provinces.
  - After his crushing defeat at Zallaqa, Alfonso VI of León and Castile swallows his pride and recalls El Cid from exile.
- 1088 – Yusuf ibn Tashfin arrives back in Algeciras (May–June) and is joined by al-Mutamid of Seville and Abd Allah of Granada, plus support from Almería and Murcia (but not the Emirs). The combined army besieges Aledo for 4 months, but Yusuf ibn Tashfin returns to Africa unsuccessful.
- 1090 – Yusuf ibn Tashfin returns to the Peninsula for the third time, takes over the kingdoms of Granada and Málaga in September and is back in Africa by the end of the year. However, this time his nephew Sir ibn Abi Bakr is left to continue the conquest. Between 30 April 1090 and 8 May 1090, Christian troops enter Santarém, Lisbon and Sintra. These were recently ceded by the Al-Mutawwakil of Badajoz in return for protection from the Almoravids.
  - July 1090: Yusuf besieges Toledo without success.
  - Yusuf ibn Tashfin, King of the Almoravids, captures Granada.
- 1091 – The Almoravids led by Muhammad ibn al-Hajj take Córdoba and the Guadalquivir valley early in the year, and then defeat a Castilian force under Álvar Fáñez who were attempting to aid Al-Mutamid of Seville. In September Seville surrenders without much of a fight to Muhammad ibn Abi Bakr. Subsequently, other Almoravids armies take Aledo and Almería. Ronda also falls and the Almoravid commander Garur executes al-Radi (the son al-Mutamid of Seville).
  - The Taifa of Mértola falls to the Almoravids.
- 1092 – With El Cid away in Zaragoza, the Valencians under the qadi Ibn Jahhaf and supported by a small Almoravid force, drive the Castilian garrison out and execute their Emir al-Qadir. Ibn Jahhaf promptly sets himself up at Emir and starts negotiating with both El Cid and the Almoravids.
- 1093 – An Almoravid army (Abu Bakr ibn Ibrahiim) approaches Valencia but then retreats without striking a blow.
  - Almoravid Sir ibn Abi Bakr takes Badajoz and Lisbon. Fall of the Taifa of Badajoz.
  - El Cid captures Valencia from the Moors, carving out his own kingdom along the Mediterranean that is only nominally subservient to Alfonso VI of León and Castile. Valencia would be both Christian and Muslim, with adherents of both religions serving in his army.
  - The Almoravids from Morocco land near Quart de Poblet and lay siege to Valencia with 50,000 men. El Cid, however, breaks the siege and forces the Almoravids to flee – the first Christian victory against the hard-fighting Africans.

== Almoravid-Almohad period (1094–1238) ==
- 1094 – By 1094, Yusuf had annexed most of the major taifas, with the exception of the one at Zaragoza. The Almoravids were victorious at the Battle of Consuegra, during which the son of El Cid, Diego Rodríguez, perished. Alfonso, with some Leónese, retreated into the castle of Consuegra, which was besieged for eight days until the Almoravids withdrew to the south.
- 1095 – The Almoravids take Santarém.
- 1097 – El Cid defeats Almoravid (Ali ibn al-Hajj) at the Battle of Bairén south of Valencia.
  - Almoravid (Muhammad ibn al-Hajj) defeat Castilians (Alfonso VI) at Consuegra. El Cid's son, Diego, is one of the dead.
  - Almoravid (Muhammad ibn Aisha) defeat Castilians (Alva Fañez) at Cuenca before ravaging the lands of Valencia.
  - Yusuf ibn Tashfin assumes the title of Amir al Muslimin (Commander of the Muslims).
- 1099 – The Almoravids besiege El Cid's Valencia, where he dies on 10 July 1099.
- 1100 – Molina falls to the Reconquista and will remain in Christian hands thereafter
- Beginning of 12th century – According to estimates, the Muslim population in Iberia may have reached 5.5 million, including Arabs, Berber and indigenous converts.
- 1102 – The followers of El Cid leave Valencia and the Muslims occupy the Peninsula as far as Zaragoza; Battle of Mollerussa near Lleida on 14 September.
  - Main Muslim mosque in Toledo converted to a church, Muslim population is sparse.
  - Christians evacuate Valencia in April–May. Almoravid (Mazdali, presumably ibn Tilankan; Muhammad ibn Fatima) occupy the city. Of the Taifa states only Zaragoza, Mallorca, and Albarracin remain independent.
- 1103 – Ali, the brother of the Almoravid governor of Granada, Muhammad ibn al-Hajj, is killed in battle with the Castilians near Talavera.
- 1105 – The Almohads, founded by Ibn Tumart, began as a religious movement to rid Islam of impurities. Most specifically, the Almohads were opposed to anthropomorphisms which had slipped into Iberian Islam. Ibn Tumart's successor, Abd al-Mu'min, turned the movement against non-Muslims, specifically Jews and Christians. Sweeping across North Africa and into Muslim Iberia, the zealous Almohads initiate riots and persecutions of both Muslims and non-Muslims. In some towns Jews and Christians are given the choice of conversion, exile, or death.
- 1106 – Yusuf ibn Tashfin dies and his son, Ali, takes over the Almoravid empire.
- 1108 – The Almoravids under Tamim ibn Yusuf ibn Tashfin, the brother of the ruler; another general is Muhammad ibn Fatima, the grandson of Sir ibn Abi Bakr, take the small town of Uclés to the east of Toledo, but a ridge top fortress holds out. Alfonso VI of León and Castile sends a relieving army under Alvar Fañez. The Almoravids decisively beat the Castilians and many leaders are killed, including Sancho, Alfonso's only son (by Zaïda, a Muslim princess) and heir. Subsequently, the Almoravids pretend to withdraw then launch a successful surprise attack on the castle. As a result, the Christians abandon Cuenca and Huete.
  - Almoravid (Tamim ibn Yusuf ibn Tashfin) storm Talavera on the Tagus to the west of Toledo. The country to the north and south of Toledo is ravaged and the city unsuccessfully besieged for a month. Alvar Fañez leads the defence. Emir Ali ibn Yusuf ibn Tashfin joined this year's Jihad but does not mention him in the actions.
- 1009-1013 – Berbers besiege Córdoba held by Umayyad Caliph Hisham II and destroy the surrounding land, including the sacking of Medina Azahara.
- 1110 – Al-Mustain of Zaragoza leads an expedition against the Christians, but is killed at Valtierra. His son, Imad al-Din, fails to establish his rule and the Almoravid (ibn al-Hajj) marches in (30 May 1110).
- 1111 – Almoravids led by Sir ibn Abi Bakr occupy Lisbon and Santarém in the west. These cities were occupied by the Almoravids in 1094-95 this suggests a fluctuating border in Portugal.
  - Henry, Count of Portugal grants city rights and privileges to Coimbra and captures Santarém to the Moors.
- 1112 – By this time the Aragonese have taken Huesca. Almoravid (ibn al-Hajj) raids into Aragonese territory and reaches the foothills of the Pyrenees.
- 1114 – A major Almoravid expedition (ibn al-Hajj from Zaragoza and Ibn Aisha of Valencia) raids into Catalonia. The army ravages Christian territory but is ambushed on its return and both Almoravid generals are killed. The Catalans under Count Ramon Berengar III take over the Balearic Islands upon the death of Emir Mubashir ibn Sulayman of Mallorca.
  - The Taifa of Beja and Évora becomes independent.
- 1115 – The new Almoravid governor of Zaragoza, Abu Bakr ibn Ibrahim ibn Tifilwit, lays siege to Barcelona for 20 days. The Almoravids withdraw when Count Ramon Berengar III returns from Mallorca. The Almoravid fleet takes the Balearic Islands. The Almoravid general and governor of Granada Mazdali ibn Tilankan dies in battle this year. He led expeditions against the Christians from 1111, so he might have led an expedition separate from those of Abu Bakr and the fleet. His son, Muhammad, governor of Córdoba, also dies in battle this year (against the Castilians), so it may have been the same expedition.
- 1117 – Almoravids under Emir Ali ibn Yusuf himself siege Coimbra, but abandon the city after failing to capture it.
- 1118 – Alfonso I of Aragon takes Zaragoza from the Muslims. Settlers in the reconquered no-man's lands of Castile are granted fueros, special rights.
  - The Aragonese led Alfonso–I the Battler seize Zaragoza and most of the central lands of the Ebro. The siege of Zaragoza lasts from 22 May 1118 to 18 December 1118. The garrison has 20 mangonels and is supported by a determined militia. As a result of a plea for help of 3 December the Almoravid governor of Valencia sends a relief force, but this is too small to help. Lleida only remains in Muslim hands because it is tributary to Barcelona.
  - Zaragoza falls to the Reconquista and will remain in Christian hands thereafter
- 1120 – Alfonso I of Aragon decisively defeats an Almoravid army including many Andalusian volunteers at the Battle of Cutanda in summer. The Aragonese take Calatayud.
- 1121 – The Córdobans rebel against the Almoravids, and drive the governor and his troops from the city. The Emir Ali ibn Yusuf ibn Tashfin leads an army from Africa to suppress the rebellion. The Almoravids besiege the city, and persuade the Córdobans to lay down their arms.
- 1122 – Aragonese take Daroca.
- 1125 – In September, Alfonso I of Aragon sets out south with an army of 4,000 knights. He travels down the east coast, bypasses the cities and ravages the countryside. He reaches Guadix unopposed in December.
- 1126 – The Almoravids deport Christians to Morocco.
  - Alfonso I of Aragon defeats the Almoravids at Arinzul near Lucena. After symbolically fishing at Motril on the south coast, Alfonso returns home undefeated.
- 1129 – Alfonso I of Aragon defeats an Almoravid army led by Ali ibn Majjuz, the governor of Seville deep inside Valencian territory. This is probably at Cullera or Alcalá near Alzira.
- 1130 – Tashfin ibn Ali ibn Yusuf (the son of the Almoravid Emir) takes the castle of Aceca in Toledo. The Almoravid (Governor of Valencia) defeat invading Aragonese and kill Gaston IV of Béarn of the First Crusade.
- 1133 – The Christian militia of Toledo reach the gates of Seville and kill the Almoravid governor (Abu Hafs Umar ibn Ali ibn al-Hajj). Further damage is averted by the intervention of Tashfin ibn Ali ibn Yusuf.
- 1134 – Almoravid (Tashfin ibn Ali ibn Yusuf) raids in the Caceres area.
  - Aragonese Alfonso I of Aragon besiege the small town of Fraga. An Almoravid relief army (Yahya ibn Ali ibn Ghaniya) defeats the overconfident Aragonese, and a sally of the garrison destroys the besiegers' camp. Alfonso I of Aragon is ambushed while raiding Lleida and is severely wounded and dies soon after.
- 1135 – Birth of Rabbi Moses Ben Maimon (called "Rambam" or Moses Maimonides).
- 1136 – Almoravid (Yahya ibn Ali ibn Ghaniya; Sa'd ibn Mardanish) retakes Mequinenza on the lower Ebro.
- 1137 – Almoravid (Tashfin ibn Ali ibn Yusuf) defeat the Castilians near Alcázar de San Juan and sack the castle at Escalona north of the Tagus.
  - Prince Afonso I of Portugal tries and fails to take Lisbon from the Moors.
- 1139 – Battle of Ourique between the Portuguese, led by Afonso I of Portugal, and the Almoravids, led by Ali ibn Yusuf.
- 1140 – Poema del Mio Cid written.
  - King Afonso I of Portugal tries and fails to take Lisbon from the Moors.
- 1144 – The Muridun ("Disciples") under Abul-Qasim Ahmad ibn al-Husayn al-Qasi rebel in the Algarve. Ibn al-Mundhir takes Silves in his name, and the governor of Beja, Sidray ibn Wazir, also supports him. Ibn al-Mundhir and Sidray ibn Wazir kill the garrison of Monchique castle, and 70 men take Mértola by surprise (12 Aug). Soon after, the Andalusian governor of Niebla, Yusuf ibn Ahmad al-Bitruji declares for the Muridun. The Almoravid Yahya ibn Ali ibn Ghaniya drives the Muridun back from Seville, and afterwards Sidray ibn Wazir splits off from the other Muridun.
  - The Taifa of Mértola and of Silves again become independent.
- 1145 – The Córdobans evict the Almoravid governor at the beginning of the year and raise up Hamdin ibn Huhammad ibn Hamdin as Emir. A Zaragozan adventurer in Castilian employ (Sayf al-Dawla ibn Hud al-Mustansir) briefly seizes power from ibn Hamdin in March but flees to the Levante due to popular hostility. Ibn Hamdin returns to power but is soon dispossessed by the Almoravid (Yahya ibn Ali ibn Ghaniya). In March the Andalusian Jund in Valencia raise up the qadi Marwan ibn Abd al-Aziz as Emir. When he cannot pay them they replace him with their own leader Ibn Iyad.
  - Portugal retakes Leiria from the Moors.
  - The Taifa of Badajoz again becomes independent and takes the Taifa of Mértola.
- 1146 – Al-Mustansir accepts the crowns of Valencia and Murcia from the hands of Ibn Iyad. The Christians defeat the Valencians (Al-Mustansir) near Albacete killing Al-Mustansir in the process. Ibn Iyad reassumes the title of Emir. Ibn Iyad dies in an obscure conflict and Muhammad ibn Sa'd ibn Mardanish becomes ruler.
  - Siege of Córdoba (1146): Alfonso VII of León and Castile defeats the Almoravids and forces Yahya ibn Ghaniya, the Almoravid governor of Al-Andalus, to become a vassal of Alfonso.
  - The Taifa of Mértola gains independence from Badajoz.
- 1147
  - Alfonso VII of Castile takes Calatrava.
  - March – King Afonso I of Portugal takes the Taifa of Santarém in a surprise attack.
  - King Afonso I of Portugal captures Santarém and the city will remain in Christian hands thereafter
  - An international Christian coalition attacks Almería by land and sea. Alfonso VII of Castile and Sancho Ramirez of Navarre march overland taking Andújar and Baeza en route. Ramon Berengar IV of Aragon-Catalonia and a Genoese naval contingent join them at Almería. There is no opposition from the Almoravid fleet. Almería falls on 17 Oct and is given to the Genoese.
  - A Crusaders' fleet arrives at the Portuguese city of Porto, and are convinced to join King Afonso I of Portugal in the Siege of Lisbon, which falls after several months. Lisbon falls to the Reconquista and will remain in Christian hands thereafter Some Muslims are killed, and the city was thoroughly plundered by the Crusaders.
  - The towns of Almada and Palmela, just south of Lisbon, are taken from the Moors by the Portuguese.
- 1148 – Almohads take Seville. Aragonese take Tortosa.
- 1149 – Aragonese take Lleida and Fraga.
  - A new Berber dynasty, the Almohads, led by Emir Abd al-Mu'min al-Kumi, takes North Africa from the Almoravids and soon invades the Iberian Peninsula.
- 1150 – The Taifas of Badajoz and of Beja and Évora are taken by the Almohads.
- 1151 – The Almohads, another more conservative African Muslim dynasty who have displaced the Almoravids, retake Almería. Jews and Mozárabes (Christians in Muslim lands) flee to the northern Christian kingdoms of Spain, or to Africa and the East, including Rambam.
  - King Afonso I of Portugal tries and fails to take Alcácer do Sal from the Moors.
  - The Taifa of Mértola is taken by the Almohads.
- 1155 – Almohads take Granada from Almoravids.
  - The Taifa of Silves is taken by the Almohads.
- 1157 – Almohads take Almería from Genoese.
- 1158 – King Afonso I of Portugal takes Alcácer do Sal from the Moors.
- 1159 – Évora and Beja, in the southern province of Alentejo, are taken from the Moors by the Portuguese.
- 1160 – Maimonides and his family took refuge in Fez in Morocco, which had been spared by the Almohads.
- 1161 – Évora, Beja and Alcácer do Sal are retaken by the Moors.
- 1162 – King Afonso I of Portugal retakes Beja from the Moors.
- 1163 – The Almohad Caliph Abd al-Mu'min al-Kumi dies and is succeeded by Abu Ya'qub Yusuf I.
- 1165 – Faked conversions become widespread with the accession of the sultan Abu Yakub. His son, Yakub Al-Mansur (1184–1199) imposes several restrictions upon the new converts. They could marry only among themselves and were forbidden to engage in large-scale trading, Doubting the sincerity of their conversion, in 1198, he also ordered them to wear a special degrading garb: a blue tunic one cubit long with ridiculously long wide sleeves. The converts were compelled to wear a blue skullcap which fell below their ears in the shape of a donkey's packsaddle, instead of the usual turbans.
- 1165 – Maimonides and his family leave Fez.
  - The Portuguese armies, led by Geraldo the Fearless, retake Évora from the Moors.
- 1166 – The Portuguese take Évora, Serpa and Moura (in Alentejo) from the Moors.
- 1168 – Portuguese frontiersman Geraldo the Fearless goes into the territory of Badajoz.
- 1169 – King Afonso I of Portugal grants the Knights Templar one third of all they take from the Moors in Alentejo.
  - Geraldo the Fearless seizes Badajoz from the Almohads.
  - King Afonso I of Portugal is wounded by a fall from his horse in Badajoz, and is captured by the competing forces of King Ferdinand II of León. As ransom King Afonso I was obliged to surrender almost all the conquests he had made in Galicia in the previous years, as well as Badajoz, that the Leonese gave back to the Almohads as a vassal territory.
- 1170 – The Almohads transfer their capital to Seville.
- 1171 – Almohad Muslims begin building the Alcázar, their palace.
- 1172 – Almohads capture Murcia. Almohads take over Valencia when ibn Mardanish dies.
- 1179 – Castile and Aragon agree on future partition of Al-Andalus.
- 1184 – The Portuguese defeat the Almohads at Santarém.
  - Yusuf I, Almohad Caliph, dies and is succeeded by Abu Yusuf Ya'qub al-Mansur.
- 1189 – King Sancho I of Portugal captures Silves.
- 1190
  - Maimonides writes the Moreh Nebukhim, or Guide to the Perplexed, using rationalism to reconcile Judaism with Aristotle's laws of nature, and Shloshah-Asar Ikkarim, the Thirteen Articles of Faith.
  - First major Almohad campaign against Portugal.
  - Gualdim Pais successfully defends Tomar from the Almohads.
- 1191
  - Second major Almohad campaign against Portugal. Alcácer do Sal, Palmela, Coina, Almada, Beja, Silves, fall to the Muslims.
- 1195 – The Almohads defeat the Castilians at Alarcos.
- 1199 – The Almohad Caliph Abu Yusuf Ya'qub al-Mansur dies and is succeeded by Muhammad an-Nasir.
- 1200 – Ibn Tumart's successor, Abd al-Mumin, turned the movement against non-Muslims, specifically Jews and Christians. Sweeping across North Africa and into Muslim Iberia, the zealous Almohads initiated riots and persecutions of Muslims and non-Muslims. In some towns Jews and Christians were given the choice of conversion, exile, or death.
- 1203 – The Almohads take Mallorca from the Almoravid.
- 1205 – Death of Maimonides in Egypt.
- 1212 – Battle of Las Navas de Tolosa: Alfonso VIII of Castile, Sancho VII of Navarre and Pedro II of Aragon, defeat Almohad (Caliph Muhammad an-Nasir) at the Battle of Las Navas de Tolosa. The Christians had 60-100,000 infantry and 10,000 cavalry, and had troops from Western Europe, Castile, Navarre, Aragon, León and Portugal, Military Orders (Knights Templar, Knights Hospitaller, Santiago, Cavatrava), and urban militias. After the defeat the Almohad empire goes into a serious decline in Spain and in North Africa.
- 1213 – Abu Ya'qub Yusuf II becomes Almohad Caliph.
- 1217 – The Portuguese take the town of Alcácer do Sal from the Moors.
- 1217 – Ferdinand III becomes king of Castile (1217–1252) and later of León (1230–1252). He will conquer Córdoba, Murcia, Jaén and Seville; Granada will remain as the sole independent Muslim kingdom.
- 1225 – Siege of Jaén by the combined allied forces of the Kingdom of Castile and the Taifa of Baeza, commanded by Ferdinand III of Castile and Abd Allah Ibn Muhammad Al-Bayyasi of Baeza against the defending Taifa of Jayyān commanded by the notable Christian knight Álvaro Pérez de Castro.
- 1227 – Denia falls to the Reconquista and will remain in Christian hands thereafter.
  - The Muslim governor of Murcia, Ibn Hud, becomes the leader of rebellions against the Almohad rulers.
- 1228 – Badajoz falls to the Reconquista and will remain in Christian hands thereafter.
  - Ibn Hud establishes himself emir of Murcia.
- 1229 – James I of Aragon, the Conqueror, retakes Mallorca, Jerica and Murviedro-Sagunto which will remain in Christian hands thereafter.
- 1230 – Alfonso IX of Leon advances along the River Guadiana, takes Mérida and Badajoz, and opens up the way for the conquest of Seville.
- 1230 – Unsuccessful Siege of Jaén by Castilian forces under Ferdinand III of Castile against the Taifa of Jayyān: the Castilian forces withdraw upon hearing news of the death of Alfonso IX of León.
- 1232 – Ibiza falls to the Reconquista and will remain in Christian hands thereafter.
  - Mohammed ibn Alhamar proclaims himself sultan of Arjona and founds the Nasrid dynasty.
- 1233 – Castile defeats Granada at the Battle of Jerez.
- 1234
  - Paio Peres Correia captures Aljustrel for Portugal.
  - King Sancho II of Portugal captures Beja.
- 1236
  - Castile forces under Ferdinand III of Castile recapture Córdoba which will remain in Christian hands thereafter. Ibn Hud is forced to sign a truce.
  - Castilian forces include urban militia.
  - The Nasrid ruler, Mohammed ibn Alhamar, approaches Ferdinand III of Castile to propose that in return for cooperating in the conquest of Muslim Seville, Granada would be granted independence as a subject of Castile. Fernando agrees and takes Seville.
- 1237 – Mohammed ibn Alhamar enters Granada, soon to become the new capital of his dominion. On returning to Granada, the embarrassed ibn-Alhamar announces "there is no victor but Allah", which was to become the motto of the Nasrid dynasty and to be inscribed all over the Alhambra palace.
- 1238
  - Aragon captures Valencia. Aragonese forces include urban militia.
  - The Emirate of Granada is officially founded.
  - James I retakes Valencia, Albarracin, Alpuente, Tortosa from the Muslims, all of which would remain in Christian hands thereafter. He also gains control of the prized paper manufacturing centre at Xàtiva.
  - Paio Peres Correia of the Order of Santiago captures Mértola for Portugal.
  - King Sancho II of Portugal captures Ayamonte.
  - Paio Peres Correia captures Estômbar and Alvor for Portugal.
  - Paio Peres Correia relinquishes Estômbar and Alvor in exchange for Cacela Velha.

== Granada-Marinid period, decline and submission to Christian rule (1243–1481) ==
- 1243 – James I of Aragon retakes Murcia from the Moors and it will remain in Christian control thereafter.
- 1244 – Arjona and Baeza fall to the Reconquista and will remain in Christian hands thereafter.
  - James I captures the Xativa Castle and city from Abu Bakr who signs the Treaty of Xàtiva effectively becoming a vassal to the Christian Kingdom.
- 1245 – Muslim troubles start in Valencia.
  - Muslim commander Al-Azraq surrenders to James I of Aragon and signs the Al-Azraq Treaty of 1245. Cartagena was captured by Aragon and will remain in Christian control thereafter.
  - Siege of Jaén (1245–1246)
- 1246 – Carmona falls to the Reconquista and will remain in Christian hands thereafter
  - Jaén is handed over by Mohammed ibn Alhamar to Ferdinand III of Castile. They sign the Treaty of Jaén, which establishes the Emirate of Granada as vassal state of Castile.
- 1247 – Having had time to secretly regroup his forces, Al-Azraq breaks the treaty that he had signed in 1245 and leads a revolt in Valencia.
  - The Muslim rebels in Valencia retreat into the territory controlled by the Mudéjar lord Al-Azraq who holds 8 castles in the Alcalá valley. They seize more castles and continue a successful guerrilla war.
  - Siege of Seville (July 1247 – November 1248) by forces of Ferdinand III of Castile, who eventually gain control of the town.
- 1248 – Christian armies under Ferdinand III of Castile take Seville after 16 months of siege, despite Muslim catapults, Greek fire, and bowmen who pierce armor. Castilian forces include urban militia.
  - 4 December, Alfonso X the Wise reconquest Alicante to Castile.
- 1249 – King Afonso III of Portugal takes Faro, Porches, Albufeira and Aljezur in the Algarve, thus completing the Portuguese Reconquista.
  - The Muslims fend off a major Christian offensive under King James I of Aragon.
  - Orihuela falls to the Reconquista and will remain in Christian hands thereafter.
- 1250 – Tejada, Constantina, Huelva and Jerez fall to the Reconquista and will remain in Christian hands thereafter.
- 1252–1284 – Alfonso X the Wise continues the Christian reconquest of the peninsula and is obliged to face the Mudéjar revolts of Andalusia and Murcia. He seeks election as emperor of the Holy Roman Empire in 1257. He drafts the Fuero de las Leyes, the forerunner of the Siete Partidas.
- 1256 – Fighting flares up between the Valencia rebels and the Aragonese.
- 1257 – Muslims use some form of incendiary weapon at Niebla.
- 1258 – King James I of Aragon takes al-Azraq's main citadel and suppresses the Valencian rebellion.
- 1262 – Niebla and Cádiz fall to the Reconquista and will remain in Christian hands thereafter.
- 1264 – Muslim revolt in Andalusia.
- 1266 – Lorca, Murcia, Purchena and Segura are retaken from the Muslims and will remain in Christian hands thereafter.
- 1275 – Four Marinid expeditions to Iberia.
  - Muslims defeat Christians at the Battle of Ecija.
- 1276 – Muslim revolt in Valencia.
- 1280 – Muslim Granadian forces under the command of Muhammad II defeat invading Christian forces under the command of Gonzalo Ruiz Girón at the Battle of Moclín.
- 1280 – Muslims use some form of incendiary weapon at Córdoba while the Spaniards use some gunpowder-fuelled early cannon.
- 1287 – Menorca falls to the Reconquista and will remain in Christian hands thereafter.
- 1292 – Castile captures Tarifa from Marinids.
- 1306 – Muslims use some form of incendiary weapon at Gibraltar while the Spaniards use (again) some gunpowder-fuelled early cannon.
- 1309 – Ferdinand IV of Castile takes Gibraltar.
  - Algeciras falls to the Reconquista and will remain in Christian hands thereafter.
- 1310 – Castile captures Gibraltar.
- 1312–1350 – War between Alfonso XI and Granada
- 1319 – Granada defeats Castilian invasion.
- 1324 – First recorded use of fire arms in the Iberian peninsula with the employ of cannons by the Nasrid troops in the siege of Huescar.
- 1325 – Alfonso XI decides to avenge the defeat against his army in 1319. His armies re-attack Granada. This time, they are victorious and manage to defeat Muhammad IV.
- 1331 – Granada uses iron balls propelled by fire or containing fire against Alicante and Orihuela.
- 1333 – Granada retakes Gibraltar from the Castilians.
- 1340 – The combined armies of King Afonso IV of Portugal and King Alfonso XI of Castille defeat a Muslim army at the Battle of Rio Salado.
- 1343 – Granada uses cannons in the (unsuccessful) defence of Algeciras.
- 1410 – An attack against Granada is led by Ferdinand, regent of Castile and future king of Aragon. He does not take Granada, but he takes the city of Antequera. This is considered the most important victory against the Muslims since the reign of Alfonso XI.
- 1415 – Portugal takes the city of Ceuta in North Africa.
- 1462 – Castile takes Gibraltar again.

== Castile-Aragón conquers the emirate of Granada (1481–1491) ==
- 26 December 1481 – The Granadines (Emir Abu l-Hasan Ali) surprise the Castilian garrison of Zahara on a stormy night. The population is enslaved.
- 1482 – Forces of Castile–Aragon (2500 cavalry and 3000 infantry) under Rodrigo Ponce de León, Marquis of Cadiz gather at Marchena (25 Feb), march to Antequera, cross the Sierra Alzerifa, and then seize Granadine Alhama on a stormy night before dawn (28 February 1482). Abu l-Hasan attempts to retake Alhama by siege (5–19 March) but withdraws unsuccessfully to Granada. Muslim troops from Ronda raid the Arcos area to try to tempt the Marquis out of Alhama. In support of his men at Alhama, King Ferdinand marches to Lucena, sends reinforcements to Alhama (30 April 1482), withdraws to Córdoba to organise a major force, and then formally takes over Alhama (14 May 1482).
  - Siege of Loja. King Ferdinand II of Aragon attacks the Granadine city of Loja (1 July 1482). The city is defended by one Ibrahim Ali al-Attar, octogenarian father-in-law of Muhammad XI. Ferdinand II of Aragon returns to Córdoba. Abu l-Hasan marches on Loja and sweeps the Rio Frio in mid July.
- 1483 – Battle of Lucena. A fast moving Castilian force raids very close of Lucena. Emir Muhammad XI of Granada becomes the first King of Granada to be captured by the Christians.
- 1484 – The Castilian-Aragónese army led by King Ferdinand II of Aragon assembles at Antequera in Spring, marches to Álora, raids Coín, Casarabonela, Almjia, Cártama, Pupiana, Alhendín, and the fertile valley of Málaga before returning to Antequera. They capture Álora and Senetil and raid into the fertile valley of Granada.
- 1485 – Al-Zagal drives Muhammad XI from Almería. Muhammad XI flees to King Ferdinand II of Aragon, at Córdoba. Ferdinand besieges Coín and Cártama. Al-Zagal then attempts to relieve the sieges, but first Coín falls (27 April 1485) then Cártama (28 April 1485). The garrison of Ronda raids Medina Sidonia but returns to find its city besieged by Ferdinand in early May. Abu Hasan of Granada dies and Al-Zagal assumes title of Emir in late May; Al-Zagal defeats a Christian foraging party from Alhama on his way to Granada. Three groups of Castilian–Aragonese march toward Moclin (late Aug). Al-Zagal ambushes and defeats the first group, although it is rescued by the second group of Christians in early September. Al-Zagal enters Moclin. The third Castilian-Aragonese group (Ferdinand) joins the other two and they take the castles of Cambil and Albahar (23 September 1485). The Castilian-Aragonese of Alhama also take the castle of Zalea in September.
- 1487 – Málaga falls to the Reconquista after the Siege of Málaga (1487).
- 1489 – Spain captures Baza. Al-Zagal surrenders to Spain.
  - Almería falls to the Reconquista.
- 1491 – Granada surrenders to the Castilian-Aragonese forces. Muhammad XI, Emir of Granada, relinquishes the last Muslim-controlled city in the Iberian Peninsula to the expanding Crown of Castile, and signs the Treaty of Granada.

== Aftermath (1492–1614) ==
- 2 January 1492 – The Catholic Monarchs, Queen Isabella I of Castile and King Ferdinand II of Aragon, take over Granada.
- 1492–1507 – The remaining Muslims in the Crown of Castile were ordered to become Catholic. King Ferdinand ordered to convert mosques to Christian churches. The king then appeals to the reigning Pope Julius II (nephew of Sixtus IV) to grant the aspirations of these new Christians. This new Christian population, forcibly converted, will come to be known as the Moriscos. Jews who were forcefully converted are known as marranos. Hundreds of thousands of Jews who did not accept conversion were expelled from Spain. They fled with nothing more than the clothes on their backs for the Ottoman Empire, Italy, Egypt and other areas.
- 1496 – All Muslims (and Jews) in Portugal were expelled from Portugal.
- 1499-1501 – A Muslim rebellion in Granada, following forced conversion of Muslims, contrary to terms of surrender; The rebellion was defeated in 1501.
- 1501-1502 All Muslims in the Crown of Castile (including the former Emirate of Granada) were forced to convert to Christianity.
- 1504 – The Oran fatwa was issued, following the forced conversion of 1501–1502, providing the basis of the secret practice of Islam in Spain.
- 1516 – King Charles I, the grandson of Ferdinand and Isabella, rises to the throne of both Castile and Aragon. With the conquest of Granada and Iberian Navarre, the modern state of Spain is formed. Muslims in the kingdom of Navarre are forced to convert.
- 1519–1522 – Revolt of the Brotherhoods in the Kingdom of Valencia. A middle-class rebellion simultaneously targeting the noble landed class and Muslim peasantry, resulting in the killing and forced conversions of many of the latter, known as Mudéjars.
- 1525 – Muslims in the Crown of Aragon are forced to convert to Christianity as a concession to the old-Christian guilds or Germanías which had revolted a few years earlier.
- 1526 – After convening a council to examine the problem, King Charles I declares that the forced conversions of the Muslims of Valencia and Aragon were valid, because they could have chosen death rather than convert.
- 1568 – Rebellion of the Alpujarras. After King Philip II introduces laws prohibiting Moorish culture, the people who had forcefully converted to Christianity in order to remain in Spain, then known as Moriscos, revolt under the leadership of Aben Humeya in Granada. The rebellion is suppressed in 1571 by John of Austria, Philip II's half-brother, and rebels are deported to different parts of the northern half of the Iberian peninsula.
- 1570 – Around 80,000 Moriscos are deported from the Kingdom of Granada resettled in towns and villages throughout Andalusia and Castile.
- 1609 – Expulsion of the Moriscos – King Philip III issues the Act of Expulsion for all remaining Moriscos, claiming that they appealed to the Ottoman Empire for military intervention in Spain. They are viewed by some as a fifth column trying to rebuild the Muslim state in the Peninsula.
- 1614 – The process of expulsion ends.

== See also ==
- Timeline of Córdoba, Andalusia
- Timeline of Seville
- Early muslims in the Americas

== Bibliography ==
- Harvey, L. P. (2005). Muslims in Spain, 1500 to 1614. University of Chicago Press. ISBN 978-0-226-31963-6.
- God's Crucible: Islam and the Making of Europe, 570–1215 (2008) by David Levering Lewis, W.W. Norton, 473 pp.
