= 1039 =

Calendar year

1039 in various calendars
- Gregorian calendar: 1039; MXXXIX
- Ab urbe condita: 1792
- Armenian calendar: 488; ԹՎ ՆՁԸ
- Assyrian calendar: 5789
- Balinese saka calendar: 960–961
- Bengali calendar: 445–446
- Berber calendar: 1989
- English Regnal year: N/A
- Buddhist calendar: 1583
- Burmese calendar: 401
- Byzantine calendar: 6547–6548
- Chinese calendar: 戊寅年 (Earth Tiger); 3736 or 3529 — to — 己卯年 (Earth Rabbit); 3737 or 3530
- Coptic calendar: 755–756
- Discordian calendar: 2205
- Ethiopian calendar: 1031–1032
- Hebrew calendar: 4799–4800
- Hindu calendars
- Vikram Samvat: 1095–1096
- Shaka Samvat: 960–961
- Kali Yuga: 4139–4140
- Holocene calendar: 11039
- Igbo calendar: 39–40
- Iranian calendar: 417–418
- Islamic calendar: 430–431
- Japanese calendar: Chōryaku 3 (長暦３年)
- Javanese calendar: 942–943
- Julian calendar: 1039; MXXXIX
- Korean calendar: 3372
- Minguo calendar: 873 before ROC 民前873年
- Nanakshahi calendar: −429
- Seleucid era: 1350/1351 AG
- Thai solar calendar: 1581–1582
- Tibetan calendar: ས་ཕོ་སྟག་ལོ་ (male Earth-Tiger); 1165 or 784 or 12 — to — ས་མོ་ཡོས་ལོ་ (female Earth-Hare); 1166 or 785 or 13

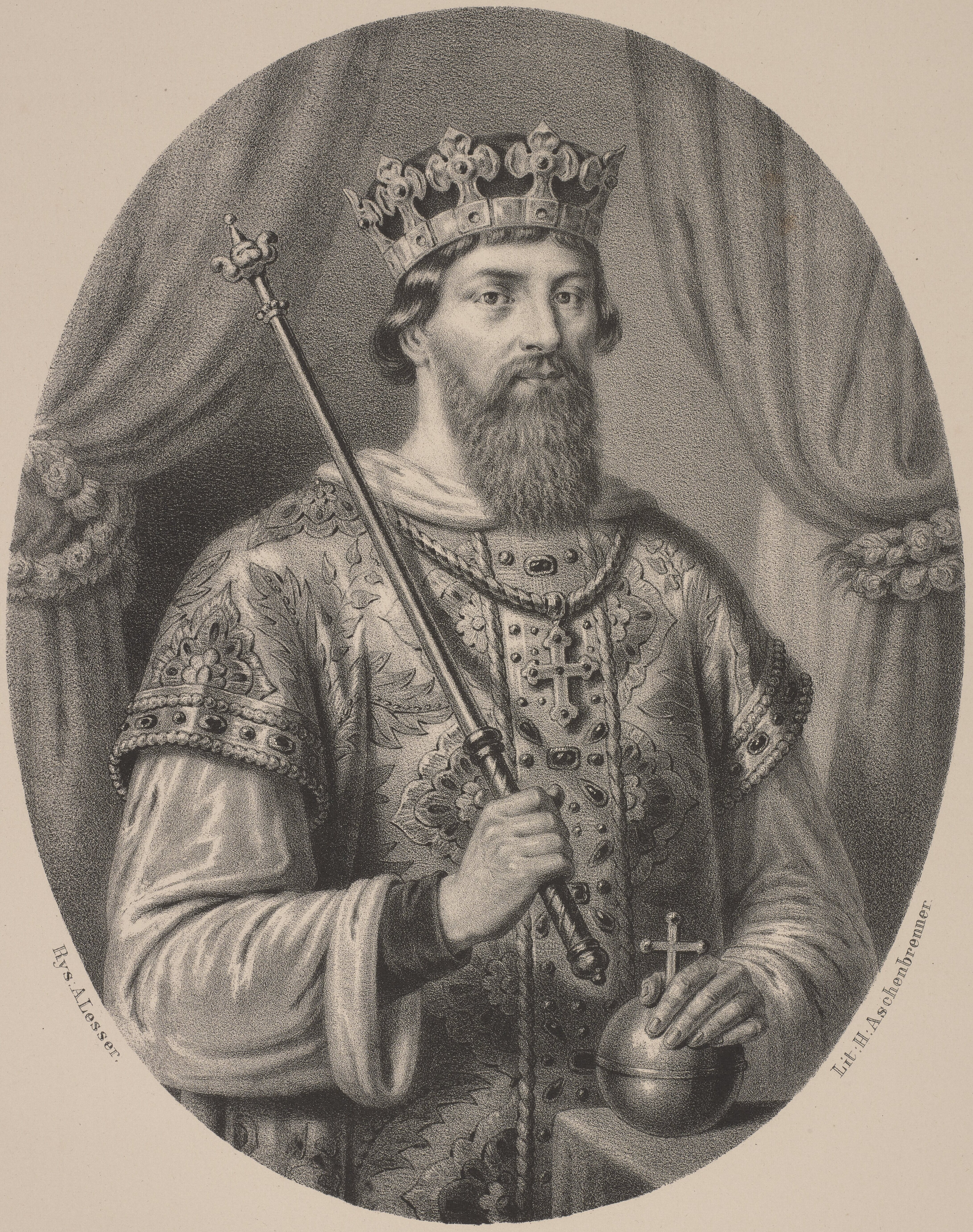
Casimir I the Restorer of Poland (1016–1058)

Year 1039 (MXXXIX) was a common year starting on Monday of the Julian calendar.

== Events ==
=== By place ===
==== Europe ====
- June 4 – Conrad II, Holy Roman Emperor, ("the Elder") dies of gout in Utrecht after a 12-year reign. He is succeeded by his 21-year-old son, Henry III ("the Black"), who also becomes king of Italy and Burgundy.
- Duke Casimir I the Restorer returns to Poland, and makes great efforts to rebuild the war-ruined country. He establishes his residence at Kraków (which becomes Poland's capital until 1596).
- The Banu Tujib clan is deposed by Al-Mustain I, who starts the Banu Hud (Huddid dynasty), which rules over the Taifa of Zaragoza for almost a century.

=== By topic ===
==== Religion ====
- The Abbey of Bec is founded at Le Bec-Hellouin in Normandy (modern France).

== Births ==
- Helibo, Chinese nobleman and chieftain (d. 1092)
- Minamoto no Yoshiie, Japanese samurai (d. 1106)
- Robert de Stafford, Norman nobleman (approximate date)
- Sancho IV, king of Pamplona (approximate date)
- Su Zhe, Chinese politician and historian (d. 1112)
- Vseslav of Polotsk, Kievan prince (approximate date)

== Deaths ==
- March 10 – Odo of Gascony (or Eudes), French nobleman
- April 16 – William III, count of Weimar and Eichsfeld
- May 27 – Dirk III (or Theodoric), count of Holland
- June 4 – Conrad II ("the Elder"), Holy Roman Emperor
- July 20 – Conrad II ("the Younger"), duke of Carinthia
- September 19 – Fujiwara no Genshi, empress of Japan (b. 1016)
- November 4 – Hugh of Chalon, French bishop
- November 29 – Adalbero, German nobleman
- Abu Nasr Mushkan, Persian statesman (or 1040)
- Iago ab Idwal ap Meurig, prince of Gwynedd
- Nathar Shah, Tamil mystic and preacher (b. 969)
- Regimbald, German abbot and bishop
- Reginar V (or Régnier), French nobleman
- Sebes, Hungarian nobleman
- Sophia I, German princess and abbess (b. 975)
- Unsuri, Persian poet and writer (or 1040)
