= Al-Tujibi =

al-Tujībī may refer to:

- Any member of the Banu Tujib
  - Al-Mundhir ibn Yahya al-Tujibi, ruler of Zaragoza from 1018 to 1022
  - Abd Allah ibn al-Hakam al-Tujibi, ruler of Zaragoza in 1039
- Abdallah ibn Abd al-Rahman ibn Mu'awiyah ibn Hudayj al-Tujibi, Abbasid governor of Egypt from 769 to 772
- Muhammad ibn Abd al-Rahman ibn Mu'awiyah ibn Hudayj al-Tujibi, Abbasid governor of Egypt in 772
- Ṣafwān ibn Idrīs (died 1202), also called Abū Baḥr al-Tujībī, Muslim traditionist and poet
- Ibn Razīn al-Tujībī, 13th-century Andalusi cookbook writer
- Alam al-Din Abu al-Qasim al-Tujibi (1271–1329), Ceutan writer
