= Battle of San Esteban de Gormaz =

The Battle of San Esteban de Gormaz can refer to any of the following battles that took place in the area around the town of San Esteban de Gormaz, Castile-León, Spain:

- Battle of San Esteban de Gormaz (917), under Ordoño II
- Battle of San Esteban de Gormaz (919), under Ordoño II; see Timeline of the Muslim presence in the Iberian Peninsula
- Battle of San Esteban de Gormaz (920), under Abd al-Rahman III
- Battle of San Esteban de Gormaz (978), under Ramiro III of León
- Battle of San Esteban de Gormaz (1054), under Rodrigo Diaz de Vivar; see Battle of San Esteban de Gormaz (917)
- Battle of San Esteban de Gormaz (1060), under Ferdinand I of León and Castile
