= Banu Sumadih =

The Banu Sumadih (Arabic: بنو صمادح) were an 11th-century Arab dynasty that ruled the Moorish Taifa of Almería (present day Almería province, Spain) in Al-Andalus. The family also produced several renowned poets, including Umm Al-Kiram.

== Dynasty ==
The Banu Sumadih family were a branch of the Banu Tujib of the Upper March. A former military leader under Almanzor, Muhammad ibn Ahmad ibn Sumadih, was ruling as governor of Huesca during the reign of his distant cousin, al-Mundir I (ruled 1018–1021) of the Taifa of Zaragoza, but ran afoul of his emir and al-Mundir attacked him and forced him into exile in the Taifa of Valencia. His son Ma'n ibn Muhammad was appointed governor of Almería by the Valencia emir, 'Abd al-'Aziz ibn Amir, in 1038, but in 1041 elevated Almería into an independent taifa. His dynasty ruled for three generations, the last Banu Sumadih emir fled the Almoravids in 1091, eventually making his way to the Hammadid king Al-Mansur ibn Nasir, who gave him command of Dellys in Algeria.

== Rulers ==
The Banu Sumadih dynasty rulers were:

- Ma'n ibn Muhammad ibn Sumadih (1041–1051), previously governor under Taifa of Valencia
- Al-Mu'tasim ibn Sumadih (1051–1091), a noted Arabic poet. He succeeded when underage, under the regency of his uncle Abu 'Utba.
- Mu'izz ud-Dawla ibn Sumadih (1091), fled to the Hammadid dynasty; granted command of north African Dellys.
