= Battle of Simancas =

Battle of the Reconquista in 939 AD

Coordinates: 41.600°N 4.817°W

- Part of the Reconquista
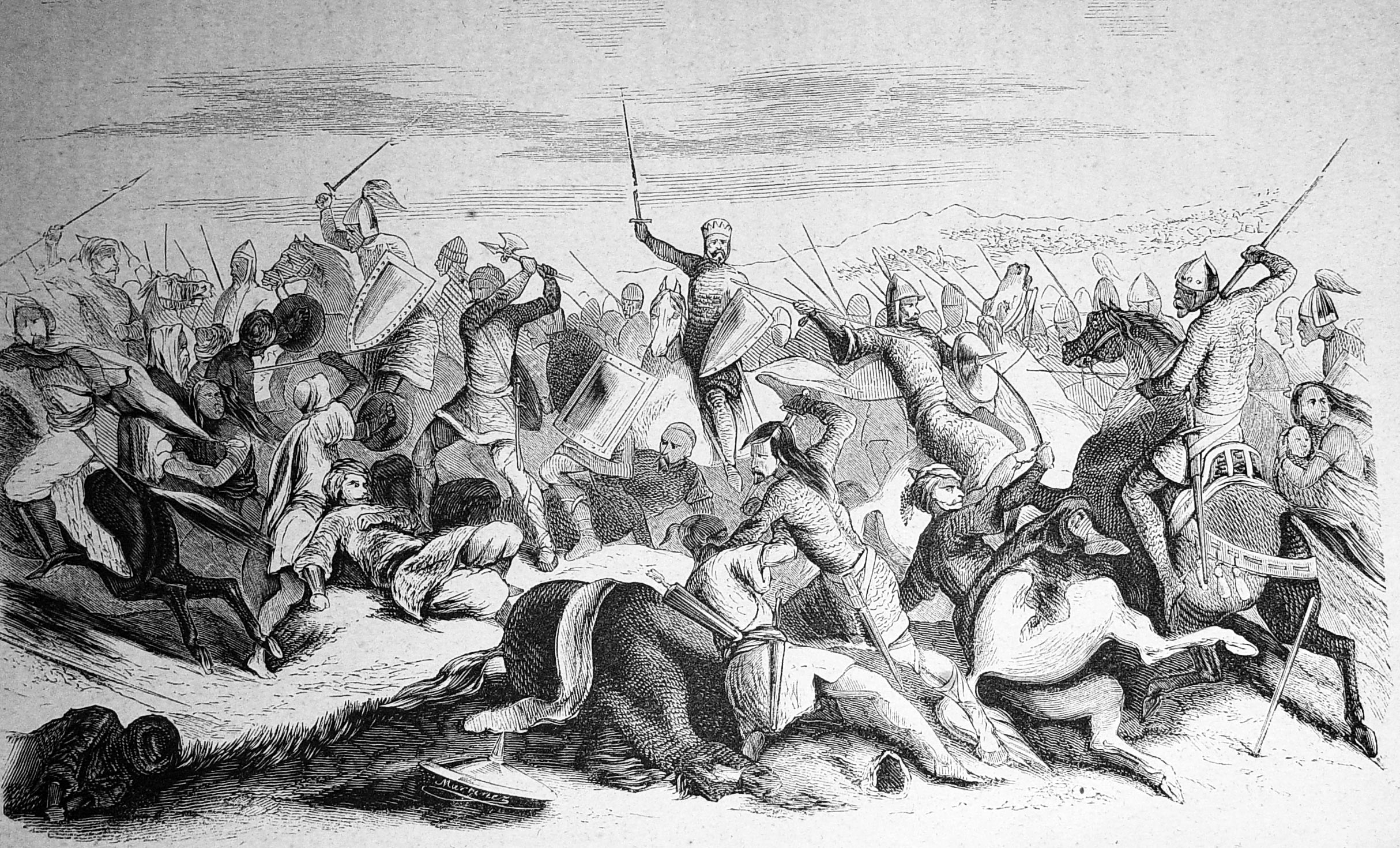
- "Don Ramiro of Léon defeats the Cordobans near Simancas", 1852, Las Glorias Nacionales
Date	19 July 939
Location	Simancas, Kingdom of León
Result	Leonese victory

Belligerents
Kingdom of León; Kingdom of Pamplona	Caliphate of Córdoba

Commanders and leaders
James the Great (according to legend); Ramiro II of León; Fernán González of Castile; García Sánchez I of Pamplona	Abd-ar-Rahman III

The Battle of Simancas (also called Alhandega or al-Khandaq) was a military battle that started on 19 July 939 in the Iberian Peninsula between the troops of the King of León Ramiro II and Cordovan caliph Abd al-Rahman III near the walls of the city of Simancas.

The battle unfolded after the army of Abd al-Rahman III launched toward the northern Christian territories in 934. Abd al-Rahman III had gathered a large army of caliphal fighters, with the help of the Andalusi governor of Zaragoza, Muhammad ibn Yahya al-Tujibi. The Leonese king Ramiro II led the counterattack with an army consisting of his own troops, those of Castile under Count Fernán González, and the Navarrese under García Sánchez I.

Moorish witnesses chronicle a spectacular eclipse of the sun that took place on the first day of the battle:

As the army arrived near Simancas, there was an awful eclipse of the sun that covered the earth of a dark yellow amid the day and it filled us and the infidels with terror as neither had seen in their life such a thing as this. Two days passed without either side making any movement.

The battle lasted some days, with the allied Christian troops emerging victorious and routing the Cordovan forces. Furtun ibn Muhammad al-Tawil, wali of Huesca, withheld his troops from the battle. He was hunted down near Calatayud by Salama ibn Ahmad ibn Salama, taken to Córdoba, and crucified in front of its Al-Qasr.

== Bibliography ==
- de la Granja, Fernando (1967). La Marca Superior en la Obra de al-'Udrí, Estudios de la Edad Media de la Corona de Aragón (in Spanish). vol. 8 (1967), pp. 457–545.
- Martínez Díez, Gonzalo (2005). El Condado de Castilla (711–1038): la historia frente a la leyenda (in Spanish). 2 volumes. Valladolid. ISBN 84-9718-275-8.
