= Abd Allah ibn al-Hakam al-Tujibi =

Ruler of Zaragoza

- Ruler of the Taifa of Zaragoza
- Reign: 1039
- Predecessor: Al-Mundhir ibn Yahya
- Successor: Al-Musta'in I
- Died: 1039
Names
- Abd Allah ibn al-Hakam al-Tujibi
- House: Banu Tujib

Abd Allah ibn al-Hakam al-Tujibi (Arabic: عبد الله بن الحكم التجيبي) was the last member of the Banu Tujib to rule the Taifa of Zaragoza before they were muscled out of control by the Banu Hud family. He ruled briefly in 1039 before the Banu Hud seized control.

Preceded by Al-Mundhir ibn Yahya	King of Zaragoza; 1039	Succeeded by Al-Musta'in I
