= Yusuf al-Mu'taman ibn Hud =

Ruler of Zaragoza (from 1081 to 1085)

Yusuf al-Mu'taman Billah

Ruler of Zaragoza
- Reign: 1081–1085
- Predecessor: Ahmad al-Muqtadir
- Successor: Al-Mustain II
- Born: Zaragoza
- Died: 1085
Names
- al-Mu'taman Billah Abu Amir Yusuf ibn Ahmad ibn Hud
- House: Banu Hud

Abu Amir Yusuf ibn Ahmad ibn Hud (Arabic: أبو عامر يوسف بن أحمد بن هود, romanized: Abū ʿĀmir Yūsuf ibn Aḥmad ibn Hūd; died c. 1085), more commonly known as al-Mu'taman, was a mathematician, and also one of the kings of the Taifa of Zaragoza. The name al-Mu'taman is itself a shortening of his full regnal name al-Mu'taman Billah (Arabic: المؤتمن بالله, romanized: al-Mūʾtaman bi-ʾLlāh, lit. 'Trustee through God').

Al-Mu'taman was the third king of the Banu Hud dynasty, reigning from 1081 to 1085, at the height of power of Muslim Zaragoza, following the thriving period of his father Ahmad al-Muqtadir. He continued his father's efforts and created around him a court of intellectuals, living in the beautiful palace of Aljafería, nicknamed as "the palace of joy".

As king, Al-Mu'taman was a patron of science, philosophy and arts, and was himself a scholar of considerable accomplishment. He knew astrology, philosophy, and especially mathematics, a discipline in which he wrote the most important treatise to come out of the al-Andalus region in the 11th century, the Kitab al-Istikmal ("Book of Perfection").

== Biography and Kingship ==
Yusuf was born on an unknown date, certainly in Zaragoza, in the palace of Aljaferia. When he ascended to the throne on the death of his father in 1081, the taifa of Zaragoza was at its peak. Al-Muqtadir divided his lands between his two sons: al-Mu'taman received the western part of the taifa with Zaragoza, Tudela, Huesca and Calatayud, while Mundhir received the coastal zone of the kingdom, including Lérida, Monzón, Tortosa and Dénia.

The first external concern of the king was the threat posed by the King of Aragon, Sancho Ramírez who aimed to extend his territories to the south, at the expense of Zaragoza. Al-Mu'taman counted on the services of the mercenary troops of the Castilian lord El Cid, who had been exiled by King Alfonso VI for conducting raids against his interests in the Taifa of Toledo, then a tributary of the king. In 1081, El Cid therefore offered his service to the king of Zaragoza, al-Muqtadir, and remained with al-Mu'taman during his reign.

Al-Mu'taman also assigned to El Cid the task of reincorporating into Zaragoza the eastern territories of his relative Mundhir, an ally of Aragon. Clashes in the border area were constant, but neither managed to reunite the paternal territory.

El Cid contained the attacks of the Aragonese until 1083, when Sancho managed to take the line of fortifications that protected Zaragoza like Graus in the east, as well as Ayerbe, Bolea, Arascués and Arguedas. El Cid served Yusuf al-Mu'tamin until 1086, when he broke his ties with Zaragoza. The circumstances in which he refused to continue serving al-Mu'tamin and his heir Ahmad II al-Mustaʿin are not fully clear and still debated.

Al-Mu'taman also tried to strengthen relations with his vassal king of Valencia, Abu Bakr, through marriage alliances. But Valencia was entangled in a complex game of alliances. Alfonso VI, skilfully using diplomacy, got al-Kadir, the king of Toledo, to hand over the city in 1085 in exchange for his help to drive Abu Bakr from Valencia, which meant, in fact, the capture of Toledo for the king of Castile. Thus, the kingdom of Zaragoza was cut off from the rest of al-Andalus, which seriously weakened its economy and made it even more vulnerable to Christian attacks. The year of the loss of Valencia was also the year of the death of Yusuf al-Mu'tamin.

== Intellectual life ==
Although it was common practice for royals to be well educated, both al-Mu'taman and his father were exceptional mathematicians. In medieval Islam, there was a movement dedicated to the translation of ancient Greek texts, ranging from philosophy, to medicine, to astronomy, and the more influential mathematical texts. Both father and son, as well as medieval Islamic translators such as the Banu Musa were known for their expansions on ancient Greek and Roman ideals. There was a stigma in the periods following medieval Islam that Islamic scholars only copied the ancient texts, offering no intellectual addition. Later it was proven that scholars such as Ibn Qurra and al-Mu'taman offered their own input and original contributions beyond their transmission of ancient ideas.

=== Mathematics ===
Ceva's theorem, discovered at the end of the 11th century by al-Mutaman.

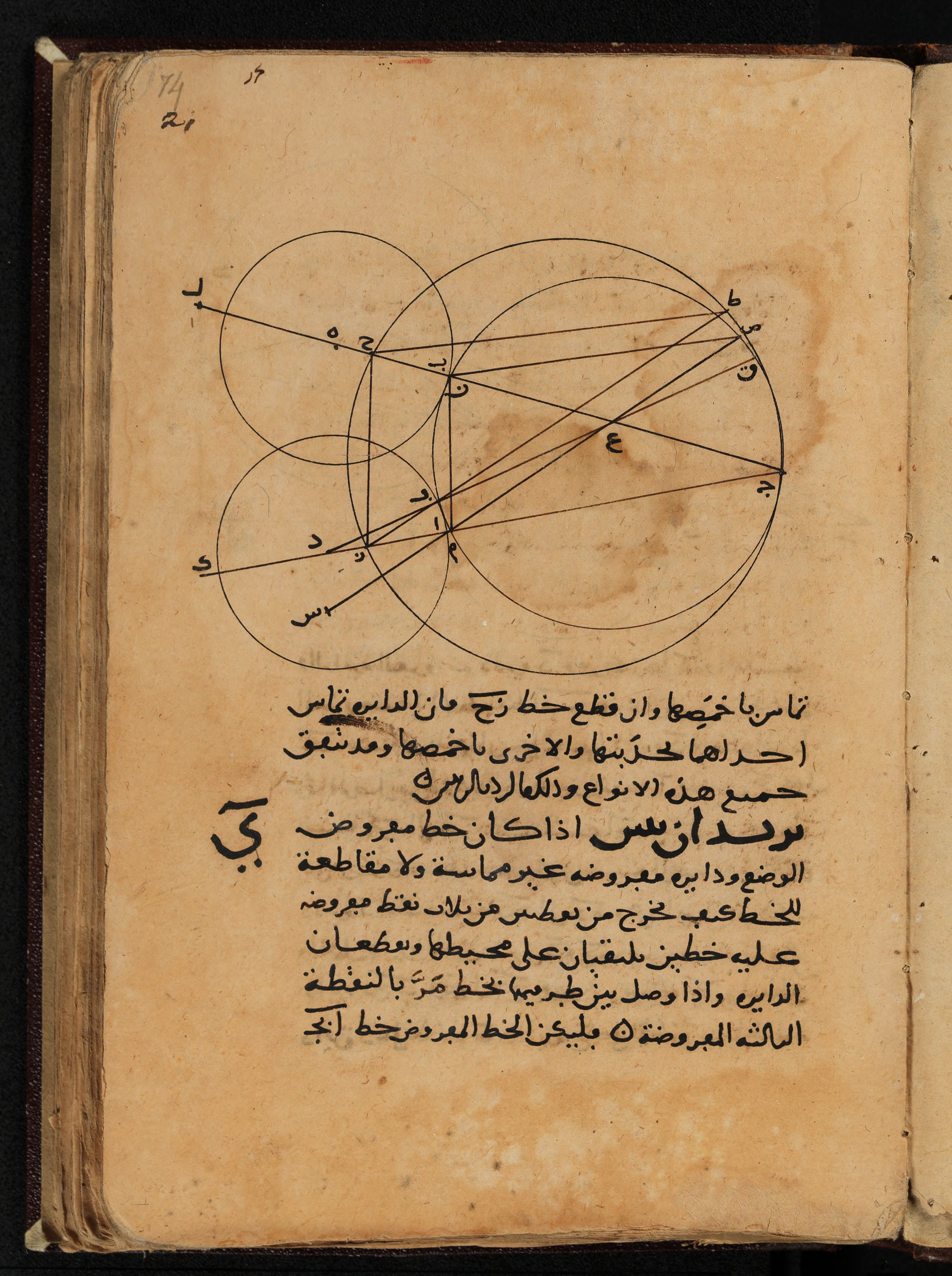
Construction of a circle tangent to two given circles and passing through a given point, Book of Perfection / Kitab al-Istikmal, by al-Mu'taman ibn Hud. Manuscript at Leiden University Libraries.

The main work of al-Mu'taman was his Kitab al-Istikmal (Book of Perfection). This book was a compendium of the Greek mathematics of Euclid and Archimedes among others, but also contained the teachings of Thabit ibn Qurra, the Banu Musa and Ibn al-Haytham, and included some theorems and proofs not found in earlier extant sources. The book only persists as fragments from several anonymous manuscripts, not including any preface or introduction, but it is clear from the remaining content that the intention was to organize and comprehensively describe the known results in Euclidean geometry in a single self-contained work. It is possible al-Mu'taman listed his sources in a now-lost introductory section, but none of the remaining fragments credit past authors or works for any of the content.

The Kitab al-Istikmal was not completed but it was still seen as an important work from the eleventh-century king. The encyclopedist Ibn al-Akfani said that had the Istikmal been completed, it would have made the existing geometrical literature superfluous. Ibn Aknin suggested that the Istikmal should be read by mathematicians alongside such works as the Elements of Euclid, On the Sphere and Cylinder of Archimedes, and Conics of Apollonius. Because this was not a completed piece of work it was never as widely copied or taught as the works of Euclid or Archimedes. A copy was sent to Egypt by Maimonides, and from there it spread to Baghdad in the 14th century, but did not directly influence later European mathematicians.

The Kitab al-Istikmal deals with irrational numbers, conic sections, quadrature of the parabolic segment, volumes and areas of various geometric objects, and the drawing of the tangent to a circle, among other mathematical problems. In the work appears an attempt to classify mathematics into Aristotelian categories. The classification includes a chapter for arithmetic, two chapters for geometry and two others for stereometry.

The Kitab al-Istikmal contains the first known formulation of Ceva's theorem, which only became known in Europe after 1678 from Italian geometer Giovanni Ceva's treatise De lineis rectis. It is unknown whether Al-Mu'taman discovered this theorem himself or obtained it from another source, and it is also unknown whether Ceva rediscovered the theorem independently. The theorem can be stated as follows: "Let ABC be a triangle and D, E, F points on the sides BC, CA, and AB. We draw the lines AD, BE and CF. These three lines intersect at one point if and only if $\frac{AF}{FB}=\frac{EA}{CE}\frac{DC}{BD}$.

== See also ==
- List of Arab scientists and scholars

Preceded by Ahmad al-Muqtadir	King of Zaragoza; 1081-1085	Succeeded by Al-Musta'in II
