= Al-Mundhir ibn Yahya =

Al-Mundhir II
- Ruler of the Taifa of Zaragoza
- Reign: 1036-1038
- Predecessor: Yahya ibn al-Mundhir
- Successor: Abd Allah ibn al-Hakam al-Tujibi
- Died: 1038
Names
- Al-Munḏir ibn Yahyà at-Tuŷībī Mu'izz ad-Dawla
- House: Banu Tujib

Al-Mundhir II ibn Yahya ibn al-Mundhir Mu'azz al-Dawlah (Arabic: المنذر بن يحي معز الدولة) or Mundhir II was the third head of the Banu Tujib group. He ruled the Taifa of Zaragoza from 1036 to 1038.

| Preceded by Yahya ibn al-Mundhir | King of Zaragoza; 1036–1038 | Succeeded by Abd Allah ibn al-Hakam al-Tujibi |
