= Umm Al-Kiram =

Poet and princess from Al-Andalous

Umm al-Kirām bint al-Mut'asim b. Sumādih
- أم الكرام بنت المعتصم ابن صُمادح
- Born: Late 11th century Almería, Al-Andalus (now Andalusia, Spain)
- Occupations: Poet, Princess
- Parent(s): Abu Yahyà Muhammad ben Ma'n, al-Mutasim
- Writing career
- Language: Arabic
- Notable work: Love poems dedicated to as-Samar

Umm al-Kirām bint al-Mut'asim b. Sumādih (Arabic: أم الكرام بنت المعتصم ابن صُمادح, late 11th century) was a princess and Andalusian poet, daughter of Abu Yahyà Muhammad ben Ma'n, al-Mutasim, king of the Taifa of Almería (which currently corresponds to the province of Almería, Andalusia, Spain).

Belonging to the dynasty of the Banu Sumadih, she had three brothers who were also poets, two of which were: Raf al-Dawla and Ubayd Allah.

Ibn Idhari claims that the intelligence of the princess was so surprising that her father raised her with her brothers, surpassing all in the art of poetic composition. This author refers to the only literary works that remain from the princess, love poems dedicated to as-Samar, a eunuch of great beauty originating in Denia, taking part in the government of the kingdom, which allowed him to be near Princess. When the father of Umm al-Kiram, King Abu Yahya, knew of the affair between the two, he had the eunuch murdered.

Her most famous poem is as follows:

Marvelously, friends,
of what has harvested a burning passion
therefore not for that, there would be lowered,
accompanied by the moon, the night,
from the highest heaven to Earth.
My passion is that I love in such a way
that if I broke up, my heart would follow him.

Oh, I wish I knew.

If there is a way to be alone together
which do not reach the ears of the spy.
How wonderful
I want to be alone with my beloved
living, even when it is in my gut and in my chest.
