= Ahmad al-Muqtadir =

Ruler of Taifa Zaragoza (died 1081)

Ahmad al-Muqtadir احمد المقتدر

Ruler of Taifa Zaragoza
- Reign: 1049 – 1081
- Predecessor: Al-Musta'in I
- Successor: Yusuf al-Mu'taman ibn Hud
- Born: Zaragoza
- Died: 1081; Zaragoza
- Burial: Zaragoza, Spain
Names
- Abu Ja'far Ahmad ibn Sulayman al-Muqtadir
- Dynasty: Hud
- Father: Al-Musta'in I
- Religion: Sunni Islam

Ahmad ibn Sulayman al-Muqtadir (or just Moctadir; Arabic: أبو جعفر أحمد "المقتدر بالله" بن سليمان, Abu Ja'far Ahmad al-Muqtadir bi-Llah ibn Sulayman) was a member of the Banu Hud family who ruled the Islamic taifa of Zaragoza, in what is now Spain, from 1049 to 1081. He was the son of the previous ruler, Al-Mustain I, Sulayman ibn Hud al-Judhami.

Preceded by Al-Musta'in I	King of Zaragoza; 1049-1081	Succeeded by Yusuf al-Mu'taman ibn Hud
