= Alam al-Din Abu al-Qasim al-Tujibi =

ʿAlam al-Dīn Abu ʾl-Qāsim ibn Yūsuf ibn Muḥammad al-Balansī al-Sabtī al-Tujībī (1271–1329) was a North African Muslim scholar. Born and educated in Ceuta, his teachers were Ibn Abi ʾl-Rabīʿ, al-Qabṭūrī, Ibn al-Muraḥḥal and Ibn al-Shāṭ. He continued his studies in ḥadīth (Islamic traditions) in 1295 when he undertook the ḥajj (pilgrimage) to Mecca. He travelled through al-Andalus, Tunis and Alexandria and crossed the sea from ʿAydhāb to Jidda. His writings, all in Arabic, include:

- Bārnāmaj (or Mashyakha), a historical bibliography
- Mustafād al-riḥla wa ʾl-ightirāb (The Benefits of Travel and Being Abroad), a narrative of his travels (riḥla) in 1295, of which only the second part of three survives
- al-Targhīb fi ʾl-jihād, which is dedicated to Sultan Abū Saʿīd ʿUthmān II
- a taqyīd on al-Dimyāṭī's Muʿjam mashāʾikhihi fī ṭalab al-ḥadīth

The Bārnāmaj and the Mustafād have been published. Ana Ramos Calvo defended a doctoral thesis on the Bārnāmaj in 1976.
