= Muslim invasion of Iberia =

Muslim (or Islamic) invasion of Iberia may refer to:

- Muslim conquest of the Iberian Peninsula (beginning in 711)
- Muslim invasions of Caucasian Iberia:
  - Umayyad invasion of Georgia (735–737)
  - Sajid invasion of Georgia (914)
  - Great Turkish Invasion (1080s)

== See also ==
- Arab rule in Georgia
