= Al-Musta'in I =

al-Mustaʿin I
- Ruler of Zaragoza
- Reign: 1039–1046/1049
- Predecessor: Abd Allah ibn al-Hakam al-Tujibi
- Successor: Ahmad al-Muqtadir
- Died: 1046 or 1049
Names
- al-Mustaʿin bi-Illah Sulayman ibn Muhammad ibn Hud al-Judhami
- House: Banu Hud

Sulayman ibn Muhammad ibn Hud al-Judhami (Arabic: سليمان بن محمد بن هود الجذامي), known by the regnal name al-Mustaʿin bi-Illah (Arabic: المستعين بالله, lit. 'He who looks for help to God'), was the first member of the Banu Hud family to rule the medieval taifa of Zaragoza, today a province in Spain. He ruled from 1039 (when he seized control of the city from the Banu Tujib) to 1046.

Preceded by Abd Allah ibn al-Hakam al-Tujibi	King of Zaragoza; 1039-1049	Succeeded by Ahmad al-Muqtadir
