= Yahya ibn al-Mundhir =

- Ruler of the Taifa of Zaragoza
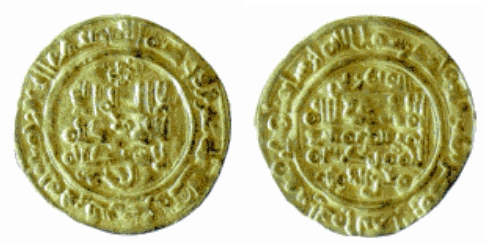
- Dinar of Yahya ibn al-Mundhir
- Reign: 1022-1036
- Predecessor: Al-Mundhir ibn Yahya al-Tujibi
- Successor: Al-Mundhir ibn Yahya
- Died: 1036
Names
- Yahya ibn al-Mundhir al-Tuğībī al-Mudhaffar
- House: Banu Tujib

Yahya ibn al-Mundhir al-Tuğībī al-Mudhaffar (Arabic: يحي بن المنذر التجيبي المظفر) was the second head of the Banu Tujib clan and emir of the Taifa of Zaragoza from 1022 to 1036.

Preceded by Al-Mundhir ibn Yahya al-Tujibi	King of Zaragoza; 1022–1036	Succeeded by Al-Mundhir ibn Yahya
