= Battle of San Esteban de Gormaz (917) =

Battle of Spanish Reconquista

- Part of the Reconquista
- Map of the Emirate of Córdoba in 929
| Date | 917 |
| Location | San Esteban de Gormaz, Spain 41°35′00″N 3°12′00″W |
| Result | Leonese victory |

Belligerents
| Kingdom of León | Emirate of Córdoba |

Commanders and leaders
| Ordoño II of León | Abu-Abdallah |
- Location of San Esteban de Gormaz

The Battle of San Esteban de Gormaz occurred in 917 during the Spanish Reconquista. The battle pitted the Umayyad forces of the Emirate of Córdoba under Abu-Abdallah against the troops of the Kingdom of León under Ordoño II of León. The battle resulted in a Leonese victory.

== Context ==
In 912, Ordoño II ordered the repoblación of San Esteban de Gormaz as the city had been one of the borderline cities between the Moorish and Christian zones of the Iberian Peninsula. This region had become depopulated early in the Muslim takeover and acted as a buffer zone between the two groups.

== The battle ==
Upon hearing of Ordoño II's efforts to repopulate and take control of the city, Abi-Abda ordered a siege in 917. Ordoño II was able to come to the city's aid successfully and routed the Muslim forces. Abi-Abda himself was captured during the fray and executed by decapitation. His head was put on display on the city's ramparts as a warning to the Muslims.

== Aftermath ==
A similar battle took place in 919, where the Muslims were repulsed. However, by 920 the city was again in Muslim hands. The city changed hands several times until 1054 when the Christian forces permanently retook the town under the command of Rodrigo Diaz de Vivar, also known as el Cid.

== Bibliography ==
- Díez, Gonzalo Martínez (2005). El condado de Castilla, 711-1038: La historia frente a la la leyenda (in Spanish). Marcial Pons Historia. ISBN 978-84-95379-94-8.
- Asa Eger, A. (18 November 2014). The Islamic-Byzantine Frontier: Interaction and Exchange Among Muslim and Christian Communities. Bloomsbury. ISBN 978-0-85773-674-1.
- Vincent j. o'Malley, C. M. (4 December 2024). Friends and Foes: Little Knowns Facts of Christian - Muslim Relations (IIUM PRESS). Iium Press. ISBN 978-967-491-393-9.
- Rivero, Isabel (January 1982). Compendio de historia medieval española (in Spanish). Ediciones AKAL. ISBN 978-84-7090-125-6.
- Silio, Vicente (1966). Un hombre ante la historia (in Spanish).
- Kennedy, Hugh (11 June 2014). Muslim Spain and Portugal: A Political History of al-Andalus. Routledge. ISBN 978-1-317-87040-1.
- Romero, Antonio Buitrago Y. (1882). Compendio de la historia de Búrgos: Para uso de los alumnos de las escuelas (in Spanish).
- Manjunath.R (3 July 2021). Timelines of Nearly Everything.
- White, Robert (15 July 1998). A River in Spain: Discovering the Duero Valley in Old Castile. I. B. Tauris. ISBN 978-1-86064-360-6.
