= Al-Mundhir ibn Yahya al-Tujibi =

King of the Taifa of Zaragoza

Al-Mundhir I
- Ruler of the Taifa of Zaragoza
- Reign: 1018–1022
- Predecessor: Caliphate of Córdoba
- Successor: Yahya ibn al-Mundhir
- Died: 1022
Names
- Al-Mundhir ibn Yahya al-Tujibi
- House: Banu Tujib

Al-Mundhir I ibn Yahya al-Tujibi (Arabic: المنذر بن يحيى التجيبي) or Mundhir I was the first head of the Banu Tujib to rule the city of Zaragoza independent of control by the Caliphate of Córdoba, founding the Taifa of Zaragoza. He ruled from 1018 to 1022.

Preceded by Ali ibn Hammud al-Nasir (Caliph of Cordoba)	King of Zaragoza; 1018–1022	Succeeded by Yahya ibn al-Mundhir
