= Banu Tujib =

Arab tribe

Banū Tujīb
- Kindite Arab tribe
- Nisba: al-Tajibi
- Descended from: Tujib ibn Shabib ibn Sakun ibn Ashras ibn Thawr
- Parent tribe: Banū Shabib
- Religion: Islam (630s and after)

The Banu Tujib (Arabic: بنو تجيب), the Tujibids (Arabic: التجيبيون, al-Tujībiyyūn, sing. Tujībi) or Banū al-Muhājir, were an Arab dynasty on the Upper March of Al-Andalus active from the ninth to the eleventh centuries. They were given control of Zaragoza and Calatayud by the Umayyads as a counterweight to the independence-minded Muwallad nobility of the region. In Zaragoza, they developed a degree of autonomy that served as the precursor to their establishment of an independent Taifa of Zaragoza after the collapse of the Caliphate of Córdoba. They ruled this taifa from 1018 until they were expelled by another Arab dynasty, the Banu Hud, in 1039. An exiled junior line of the family, known as the Banu Sumadih, established themselves as rulers of the Taifa of Almería, which they held for three generations, until 1090.

== Family origin ==
The historian Ibn Hazm traced the Banu Tujib to two brothers who accompanied Musa ibn Nusayr from Egypt for his conquest of Iberia (early 710s), ʿAmira and ʿAbd Allah, both sons of al-Muhajir ibn Naywa. They were installed in Aragon, and ʿAmira is said to have served as governor of Barcelona for two years, while ʿAbd Allah was ancestor of the later family. The 11th-century historian al-Udri claimed the Banu Salama, who governed Zaragoza in the late 8th century were a branch of the Banu Tujib, but his contemporary Ibn Hazm included in the earliest generation of the Banu Qasi a son named Abu Salama, apparently hinting at a derivation of the Banu Salama from this Muwallad Upper March family. In the second half of the 9th century, faced with the repeated threat of the rebel Banu Qasi clan, emir Muhammad I of Córdoba recruited to his side the sons of ʿAbd al-ʿAziz ibn ʿAbd al-Rahman al-Tujibi, giving them several towns, including Daroca, as well as 100 dinars each, and charging them with fighting the Banu Qasi. He rebuilt Calatayud and gave it to ʿAbd al-Rahman ibn ʿAbd al-ʿAziz in 862/3. During this period, the family was also involved in long-running hostilities with Ahmad ibn al-Barraʼ al-Qurashi, governor of Zaragoza, and in one of their battles, ʿAbd al-Rahman's son, ʿAbd al-ʿAziz ibn ʿAbd al-Rahman al-Tujibi, lord of Daroca, was killed. Two other sons of ʿAbd al-Rahman, al-Mundhir in Calatayud and Muhammad in Zaragoza, would found lineages that long held positions of power on the Upper March. A fourth son, Sumadih, is known only as ancestor of the Banu Sumadih, who would take power in Almería in the 11th century.

== Tenth century ==
Holdings of Banu Tujib. Taifas: Zaragoza (blue); Almería (red). Long-term governorships: Zaragoza; Calatayud (orange); Daroca (black). Brief/intermittent governorships: Barcelona (green); Huesca (brown); Lérida (pink); Monzón (turquoise); Tudela (yellow); Zamora (purple).

=== Zaragoza ===
==== Muhammad ibn ʿAbd al-Rahman ====
The accession of emir Abdullah led to shuffling of the court, and the father of Ahmad al-Qurashi, who had been the visier, fell out of favor. The new emir then encouraged the Tujibis to take action against the governor. In events concluding in January 890, ʿAbd al-Rahman and his son Muhammad carried out a plot in which Muhammad feigned a dispute with his father so that he and his men would be admitted to the city and gain trusted access to Ahmad's inner circle. Muhammad then murdered Ahmad, but when ʿAbd al-Rahman came to claim the city Muhammad barred him entry and successfully petitioned the emir to be named governor in Ahmad's place. ʿAbd al-Rahman died shortly thereafter, in 277 A.H. (890/1) at the age of 58.

Muhammad ibn ʿAbd al-Rahman established what was, in effect, an autonomous hereditary protectorate. He remained loyal to Córdoba and continued the family's fight against the Banu Qasi, including resisting the 17-year siege of Zaragoza by Muhammad ibn Lubb and his son Lubb ibn Muhammad. In 919, he took the towns of Roda de Isábena and Monzón, though the latter was recaptured by an alliance of Sancho I of Pamplona, Bernard I of Ribagorza, and Amrus ibn Muhammad of Huesca. When in 921 Muhammad took the castle of Samaliq (unidentified), his nephew Mutarrif ibn al-Mundhir al-Tujibi arrived with men to help garrison the town, but Muhammad marched out against him and forced him to withdraw back to Calatayud with heavy casualties. In 923, Sancho I captured and murdered Muhammad ibn ʿAbd Allah, head of the rival Banu Qasi clan, and Muhammad al-Tujibi and his son Hisham took advantage of the power vacuum to take Tudela and turned it over to the emir. After al-Tujibi joined ʿAbd al-Rahman III on his 924/5 campaign against Pamplona, the caliph awarded Tudela to the Zaragoza leader's grandson, Muhammad ibn Hisham ibn Muhammad.

The elder Muhammad al-Tujibi, who would be known to history as Muhammad al-Anqar or al-Aʿwar ('the one-eyed') died in January 925. His son Hashim ibn Muhammad was allowed to succeed him, but faced a revolt by his Tujibid kinsmen of Calatayud and Daroca, who besieged some of his castles. Hashim attacked and dispersed them, ending their hostilities. He died five years later, in October 930. It is presumably from him that the Zaragoza branch of the Banu Tujib came to be called the Banu Hashim.

==== Muhammad ibn Hashim ====
ʿAbd al-Rahman III, now caliph, was hesitant to allow Muhammad ibn Hashim to succeed his father as governor of Zaragoza. He and his family, along with the Banu Shabrit sons of Muhammad al-Tawil of Huesca, went to the caliph to plead their loyalty, and on acceding to his demands that Muhammad pay an unspecified tribute and agree to participate in military raids on Córdoba's behalf, he was named governor in 931. Not long thereafter, however, Muhammad and his Banu Shabrit allies refused to participate in the caliph's campaign against Osma.

In 934 ʿAbd al-Rahman III began a campaign in the north against Ramiro II of León, but also targeted Muhammad ibn Hashim al-Tujibi. Refusing to submit to ʿAbd al-Rahman, al-Tujibi formed an alliance with Ramiro, so in 935 the caliph launched a siege of Zaragoza that he was then forced to abandon as he was faced with rebellion on several fronts until he executed an Umayyad rival in 936, and he then sent an army to subjugate Zaragoza in 937. Christian and Muslim sources paint the relationship between Muhammad al-Tujibi and Ramiro II in different ways. According to Ibn Hayyan, after inconclusively confronting al-Tujibi on the Ebro, ʿAbd al-Rahman briefly forced the Kingdom of Pamplona into submission, ravaged Castile and Alava, and met Ramiro in an inconclusive battle. Ibn Hayyan, basing himself on ʿIsa al-Razi, stated that al-Tujbi voluntarily sought an alliance with Ramiro II in order to avoid submitting to ʿAbd al-Rahman, but ʿAbd al-Rahman negotiated a truce with Ramiro in order to isolate al-Tujibi, and then forced al-Tujibi's surrender in 937. However, according to the Chronicle of Sampiro, in which al-Tujibi is called "Abohayha" (Abu Yahya, a kunya naming him as father of Yahya), Ramiro had attacked al-Tujibi and forced his submission, but once ʿAbd al-Rahman arrived with his armies, al-Tujibi changed his allegiance to the Umayyads.

Following his defeat in 937, Muhammad ibn Hashim was forced to temporarily surrender Zaragoza to the caliph and reside in Cordoba, but was then allowed to return to the governorship, while being prohibited to negotiate independently with the Christian states, and required to pay tribute and to participate in the caliph's campaigns. Thus, in 939 the combined Umayyad and Tujibid armies met Ramiro in the Battle of Simancas, which resulted in the defeat of ʿAbd al-Rahman and the capture of al-Tujibi. ʿAbd al-Rahman III temporarily placed Muhammad's son, Yahya ibn Muhammad, in charge of Muhammad's troops and also sent him mercenaries under Muhammad's brother Yahya, who was named commander of the Upper March, before in 941 sending his secretary and doctor, Hisdai ben Isaac ben Shaprut, to negotiate a treaty with Ramiro II. After Muhammad's release was secured, Abd al-Rahman formally acknowledged Yahya's right to succeed Muhammad in all of this lands and titles and granted to Muhammad's brother, another Yahya, the castles of Warsa/Orosa (not identified), María de Huerva and Lérida, the first of these having been held by another brother, Ibrahim, before the family came to blows with the caliph in 934/5. Muhammad was again governing Zaragoza in 942, when he was named visier, and ʿAbd ar-Rahman sent Turkish slave soldiers from Cordoba to Zaragoza so that the Tujibis could deploy them against García Sánchez I of Pamplona, Ramiro's ally. Ramiro, in turn, sent forces to help García. However, Ibn Hayyan's history ends in that year, so these events are not known in as much detail as the previous campaigns of ʿAbd ar-Rahman against Ramiro and al-Tujibi. Muhammad ibn Hashim al-Tujibi died in June 950, and as had been agreed, the caliph named Yahya ibn Muhammad as his successor. As another sign that the Zaragoza branch of the Banu Tujib had restored themselves to the caliph's favor, when Muhammad's brother Yahya ibn Hashim died at Toledo in 952, his castles were confirmed to his brother Hudayl ibn Hashim, who had held them before the caliph's punitive 934 campaign against the family.

==== Late Umayyad Caliphate ====
The leadership of the Banu Hashim branch of the Tujibis becomes confused after Muhammad, the sources being contradictory and apparently confused. Yahya al-Zuqaytar ibn Muhammad al-Tujibi was apparently still governing Zaragoza during the reign of caliph Al-Hakam II. Al-Andalus chroniclers report that in 975, a governor of Zaragoza accompanied a campaign against Castile, but while some call the leader Yahya, others name him as ʿAbd al-Rahman, the name of Yahya's brother and successor. Yahya also took part in the campaign against Africa at this time, returning to Zaragoza before his death. About this time, the governor of Lérida and Monzón, Rashiq al-Barghawati, was ordered to turn over his charges to Hashim ibn Muhammad ibn Hashim al-Tujubi, younger brother of Yahya and ʿAbd al-Rahman.

After Almanzor had consolidated his power in 983, he formed an alliance with the Tujibis of Zaragoza to be his military support. However, in 989 one of Almanzor's sons conspired with the Tujibis against his father, and the Tujibid leader, ʿAbd ar-Rahman ibn Muhammad, (Note: There is contradictory information about the Tujibid who plotted against Almanzor, with one source calling him ʿAbd al-Rahman ibn al-Mutarrif and the other ʿAbd al-Rahman ibn Muhammad. Lévi-Provençal and Dozy both followed the first, but there is no al-Mutarrif in the Banu Tujib pedigree at this time, while there is an ʿAbd al-Rahman ibn Muhammad in this generation, brother of his predecessor Yahya.) joined a pact that would see the family control the marches of the Caliphate, but Almanzor learned of the plot and executed Abd ar-Rahman al-Tujibi as well as his own son. ʿAbd al-Rahman's own eldest son, al-Hakam, is also said by Ibn Hazm to have been killed, though it is unclear if this happened at the same time. To mollify the Tujibis, Almanzor soon replaced the executed rebel with his nephew, ʿAbd al-Rahman ibn Yahya al-Tujibi, but there is no further mention of the family during the chaos of the collapsing Umayyad caliphate. When they next appear, early in the following century, control of Zaragoza had passed to a different branch of the family.

=== Calatayud ===
In the late 9th century, Al-Mundhir, son of ʿAbd al-Rahman ibn ʿAbd al-ʿAziz al-Tujibi, succeeded his father in Calatayud. He became embroiled in a private conflict with Mutarrif ibn Dhi-l-Nun, which resulted in a series of battles, and in one of these in May 921 he was killed, and ʿAbd al-Rahman III named al-Mundhir's son, ʿAbd al-Rahman, to succeed him as governor of Calatayud. ʿAbd al-Rahman ibn al-Mundhir continued his father's private war with the Banu Dhi-l-Nun, but later he and his brother Mutarrif were captured by Sancho I of Pamplona. ʿAbd al-Rahman ibn al-Mundhir arranged for Sancho to release Mutarrif so he could collect the ransom for both of them, but when Mutarrif reached Calatayud, he betrayed ʿAbd al-Rahman and installed himself in the city and was appointed its governor in 930. When ʿAbd al-Rahman finally ransomed himself, he resettled in Samaliq with the acquiescence of the caliph.

Al-Mundhir accompanied his cousin Muhammad ibn Hashim and the Banu Shabrit to Córdoba in 931 to swear fealty to the caliph, Whose campaigns he joined, including his 933/4 attack on Zaragoza, but he fell out with the caliph's general and was named a rebel, forcing him into alliance with his cousin Muhammad ibn Hashim and with his family's old enemies, the Banu Dhi-l-Nun. Caliph ʿAbd al-Rahman III arranged for Christian mercenaries from Alava to attack the city in 937, and Mutarrif was killed the same day the city fell, 29 June 937, and control of Calatayud was given to others. (Note: Ibn Hazm reports this fate for a different son, Suleyman, and does not give al-Mundhir a son named Mutarrif. It is unclear if there were two sons, both killed by ʿAbd al-Rahman, or if Ibn Hazm mistakenly assigned the wrong name to Mutarrif.) However, al-Hakam ibn al-Mundhir, a brother of Mutarrif, had remained loyal to the caliph and fought a private war with his brother until the latter's death. After accompanying the campaign against Ramiro II, he was made governor of Calatayud in 940 and continued to rule it until his death in February 950, at the age of 49. He was succeeded by his son al-ʿAsi ibn al-Hakam, who governed Calatayud until his death in 972, when his sons Hakam, Ahmad, ʿAbd al-ʿAziz and Lubb went to Córdoba to petition to succeed him.

The next few years are obscure, but in 975 the caliph confiscated all of the Banu Tujib lands, in Zaragoza, Calatayud, Lérida and Tudela. He appears to have given Calatayud to Hisham, brother of al-ʿAsi. Ibn Hazm reports that Hashim was in charge of Calatayud when he submitted to Ghalib ibn Abd al-Rahman, whose enemy Almanzor then attacked and killed Hisham. This probably corresponds to Almanzor's 981 campaign against Calatayud. In Hisham's place as leader of Calatayud, Almanzor installed another brother, ʿAbd al-ʿAziz of Daroca, who had been allied with Almanzor against his brother. (Note: Ibn Hazm describes this son of al-Hakam under the name of ʿAbd Allah when reciting his alliance with Almanzor, but then when giving a list of his children calls him ʿAbd al-ʿAziz, the name given him in other records.) He was dead by 997, when the brother of governor al-Hakam ibn ʿAbd al-ʿAziz of Calatayud was killed in an attack from Pamplona. As Abu al-ʿAsi al-Hakam ibn ʿAbd al-ʿAziz, this man was holding Tudela when he died in 1005/6, his kunya naming his son as an al-ʿAsi. His properties were divided between his brother Hisham ibn ʿAbd al-ʿAziz, lord of Daroca, and their distant cousin al-Mundhir ibn Yahya al-Tujibi. By the 1040s, the Tujubies had been removed from control of Calatayud, and the first Banu Hud ruler of the Zaragoza taifa gave it to his son, Muhammad.

=== Daroca ===
ʿAbd al-ʿAziz, son of the late-ninth-century ʿAbd al-Rahman ibn ʿAbd al-ʿAziz al-Tujibi, had been granted Daroca, and was killed in battle against Ahmad ibn al-Barraʼ during his father's lifetime. He was succeeded by his son, Yunis ibn ʿAbd al-ʿAziz. He would be a close ally of his uncle al-Mundhir al-Tujibi of Calatayud. In 937, as part of the Caliphate's campaign against Tubijid Zaragoza, Daroca was attacked and Yunis killed. His children fled to Zaragoza, where little is known about them or their descendants until the early 1000s, when a great-great-grandson of Yunis, al-Mundhir ibn Yahya, who early in his life had served as a simple soldier, was appointed to be governor of Zaragoza and made himself ruler of an independent taifa state.

After dispossessing Yusuf, and taking Zaragoza, the caliph gave Daroca to his first-cousin, al-Hakam ibn al-Mundhir al-Tujibi, formally naming him governor in 940. Daroca was probably then, like Calatayud, governed by al-ʿAsi ibn al-Hakam, and it was taken from the family in 975, but was immediately restored to al-ʿAsi's brother, ʿAbd al-ʿAziz, who had been allied with Almanzor against his brother. He rebuilt the castle. In the time of taifa king Al-Mustaʿin I (1039-1046), Daroca was ruled by Hisham ibn ʿAbd al-ʿAziz. He, in turn, was followed by his son, another ʿAbd al-ʿAziz.

=== Others ===
There are other Tujibis seen in the historical record who belong to more distant branches of the family, or who cannot be definitively placed. A disciple of scholar Muhammad ibn Waddah ibn Bazi al-Qurtubi was Abu ʿUthman Saʿid ibn ʿUthman ibn Muhammad ibn Malik ibn ʿAbd Allah al-Tujibi, who died in 917. His great-great-grandfather, ʿAbd Allah, is apparently the ʿAbd Allah ibn al-Muhajir who first came to Iberia in the 710s. A Muhammad ibn Fath al-Tujibi was reported killed at Barbastro in 929, and Ibn Hayyan names numerous family members, some of whom are not found in the genealogy of the family by Ibn Hazm. In 975, the governor of Lérida captured a rebel, Abu-l-Ahwas Maʿn ibn ʿAbd al-ʿAziz al-Tujibi, who for the previous six years had taken refuge at Castillonroy under the protection of either the Count of Ribagorza or of Pallars, and sent him to Córdoba. He must have reached an accommodation with Almanzor, because in 981 he co-commanded one wing of the army at the Battle of Torrevicente, and he was made governor of Zamora after it was taken from León in 999.

== Taifa of Zaragoza ==
In 1005/6, al-Mundhir ibn Yahya, a Tujibid of the branch of Yusuf ibn ʿAbd al-ʿAziz of Daroca, was named as governor of Tudela on the death of 'Abu al-ʿAsi al-Hakam ibn ʿAbd al-ʿAziz. His early life is obscure, other than that he had been a simple soldier. He is said to have been appointed governor of the Upper March by Hisham II, probably late in his first reign, which ended in 1009. He had friendly relations with Ramon Borrell, Count of Barcelona, who would march troops through Zaragoza on their way to help restore Hisham II in 1010. When in 1016, the Berber Ali ibn Hammud al-Nasir killed Sulayman ibn al-Hakam and had himself elected caliph in place of the ruling Umayyad dynasty, al-Mundhir at first maintained an ambiguous standing with the new ruler. However, he soon began to plot Ali's removal in favor of an Umayyad scion, ʿAbd al-Rahman IV. Ali was assassinated in 1018, and allies of ʿAbd al-Rahman IV fought those of Ali's brother, Al-Qasim al-Ma'mun in a battle won by the latter. Al-Mundhir then returned to Zaragoza, and declared independence, establishing the Taifa of Zaragoza, which he ruled as emir until his death in 1023/4.

Al-Mundhir (I) was succeeded by his son Yahya ibn al-Mundhir. He married the sister of Ismaʿil ibn Dhi-l-Nun, and fought a war with the widow of his father's ally, Ramon Borrell, Ermesinde, the countess-dowager of Barcelona. He initially, nominally, recognized the imprisoned caliph al-Qasim, but in 1026/7 he switched his nominal allegiance to the caliph in Baghdad. Yahya died between 417 A.H. (1026/7) when he last issued money, and 420 A.H. (1029/30), when the first of his son and successor, al-Mundhir ibn Yahya (II) appear. He was no more than 19 when he succeeded his father, and his reign would end in violence. Like his father, he would initially support the Baghdad caliph, but in 1032 he transferred his support to native caliph Hisham III, even though the latter had already been forced to flee to Lérida and shelter with its lord, Sulayman ibn Muhammad ibn Hud al-Judhami, a former military commander under al-Mundhir I and likewise a nephew of Ismaʿil ibn Dhi-l-Nun. Following Hisham's death in 1037, al-Mundhir II no longer gave indication on his coinage of recognizing any caliph.

In 1039, al-Mundhir II's premier qadi, Abu al-Muhammad ʿAbd Allah ibn al-Hakam al-Tujibi, grandson of the ʿAbd al-Rahman executed by Almanzor, murdered his cousin. the emir. While one chronicler claimed the action was taken on behalf of the false-Hisham II put forward by Abu al-Qasim Muhammad ibn Abbad of Seville, this was likely a pretext and ʿAbd Allah immediately sought the approval of Zaragoza's elite to reclaim the leadership of Zaragoza his branch of the family had previously exercised. While the elites acquiesced, the people viewed him as a usurper, and civil unrest ensued that forced ʿAbd Allah to flee to Rueda, taking with him the treasury of the taifa as well as several prisoners, including ʿAbd Allah and Ahmad, the brothers of his murdered predecessor. Sulayman, lord of Lérida, marched to the city and established himself as ruler of the Taifa of Zaragoza as Al-Mustaʿin I. His family, the Banu Hud, would continue to rule Zaragoza until it was taken from his great-grandson by the Almoravids in 1110. With the flight of ʿAbd Allah al-Tujibi and his prisoner cousins, the Zaragoza branches of the Banu Tujib family passed into obscurity; the deaths of al-Mundhir II's brothers without issue left no descendants of al-Mundhir I.

== Taifa of Almería ==
Another son of the late-9th-century family patriarch ʿAbd al-Rahman ibn ʿAbd al-ʿAziz al-Tujibi, named Sumadih, would give rise to a branch of the family known as the Banu Sumadih. A member of this line, Abu Yahya Muhammad ibn Ahmad, had served as governor of Huesca under Almanzor, but early in the next century found himself at odds with his distant kinsman, al-Mundhir I, who attacked him and Muhammad and his family were forced to flee. They took refuge in the Taifa of Valencia, where he was welcomed by ʿAbd al-ʿAziz ibn Amir, Almanzor's grandson. His sons Maʿn and Abu al-ʿUtbi married the daughters of ʿAbd al-ʿAziz, and when the latter added Almería to his taifa in 1038, he made Maʿn ibn Muhammad its governor, exercising both civil and military control. In 1042, however, Maʿn forswore allegiance to Valencia and made Almería an independent taifa that he ruled until his death in 1052.

Maʿn was succeeded by his fourteen-year-old son Muhammad ibn Maʿn ibn Sumadih, called al-Muʿtasim, and later known by the kunya Abu Yahya. He initially ruled under the regency of his uncle Abu ʿUtba al-Sumadih. His 41-year tenure was marked by frequent warfare with neighboring taifas, but he was also a noted poet. He married the daughter of Ali ibn Muyahid of Denia and had four children, all themselves poets, sons Ahmad Muʿizz al-Dawla, Rafi-l-Dawla, and Abu Jaʿfar Ahmad, and daughter Umm Al-Kiram. At the time of his death in April/May 1091, the Almoravids were encamped outside the walls of Almería. When the fall of Seville the following September freed up additional Almoravid forces, making his position untenable, Abu Yahya's son and successor Ahmad Muʿizz al-Dawla abandoned the taifa and fled to Algeria, where he lived the remainder of his life in exile in the port city of Dellys.

Tree of the Banu Tujib

Shabib	Ashras	ʿAdi	ʿAmir	Zayd	ʿAydana	Rabiʿa
Naywa	Shurayh	Harmala	Yazid
Barcelona	al-Muhajir
ʿAmira fl.710s	ʿAbd Allah fl.710s
ʿAbd al-Rahman
ʿAbd al-ʿAziz
ʿAbd al-Rahman c. 832-890/1	others
Zaragoza	Daroca	Calatayud
Muhammad d. 950	ʿAbd al-ʿAziz † bef. 890	Sumadih
al-Mundhir d. 921
Yahya d. Egypt	Yunis d. 936/7	(descendants)
Hisham d. 930
Muhammad	ʿAbd al-ʿAziz	al-Hakam; 900/1-950	ʿAbd al-Rahman fl. 920s	Mutarrif k. 937	Banu Sumadih
Muhammad d. 950	Yahya d. 952	Hudayl fl. 952	Ibrahim fl. 934/5	Mutarrif
al-ʿAsi d. 972	Hisham k. 981
Yahya al-Zuqaytar fl. 960s	ʿAbd al-Rahman k. 989	Hisham	Yahya	ʿAbd al-ʿAziz fl. 981	Ahmad
Taifa of Zaragoza	al-Hakam fl. 972	Ahmad fl. 972	ʿAbd al-ʿAziz fl. 972	Lubb fl. 972
ʿAbd al-Rahman al-Simaya fl. 989	al-Mundhir I d. 1023/4	Huesca
al-Hakam	Hisham fl. 1040s	al-Hakam d. 1005/6	brother k. 997	Muhammad
Yahya d. 1026/30	Taifa of Almería
al-ʿAsi	Maʿn d.1052	Abu ʿUtba regent 1052-1054/5
ʿAbd Allah dep. 1039	al-Mundhir II k. 1039	ʿAbd Allah fl. 1039	Ahmad fl. 1039	ʿAbd al-ʿAziz al-Zahid
Muhammad al-Mutasim d. 1091
Muhammad
Ahmad; Muʿizz al-Dawla dep. 1091

== Sources ==
- Cañada Juste, Alberto (1980). "Los Banu Qasi (714-924)". Príncipe de Viana (in Spanish) (41): 5–95. ISSN 0032-8472.
- Collins, Roger (2014). Caliphs and Kings: Spain, 796-1031 (Paperback ed.). Wiley Blackwell.
- Fierro, María Isabel (1988). Kitab al-Bidaʿ (Tratado contra las Innovaciones) (in Spanish). Madrid.
- Granja, Fernando de la (1967). "La Marca Superior en la Obra de al-ʿUdrí". Estudios de Edad Media de la Corona de Aragon (in Spanish). 8: 457–545.
- Lévi-Provençal, E. (1987). "Maʿn b. Muhammad b. Ahmad b. Sumadih al-Tudjibi, Abu ʾl-Ahwas". In Bosworth, C. E.; Donzel, E. van; Lewis, B.; Pallat, Ch. (eds.). The Encyclopedia of Islam, New Edition. Vol. VI. Leiden: E. J. Brill. pp. 344–345.
- Maíllo Salgado, Felipe (1991). "Zamora en las fuentes árabes". Primer Congreso de Historia de Zamora (in Spanish). Vol. 3. pp. 87–92.
- McKitterick, Rosamond; Abulafia, David (2004). Luscombe, David; Riley-Smith, Jonathan (eds.). The New Cambridge Medieval History: Part II. c. 1024-c. 1198. Cambridge University Press. ISBN 978-0-521-41411-1.
- Middleton, John (2015). World Monarchies and Dynasties. Taylor & Francis. ISBN 978-1-317-45157-0.
- Phillips, William D. Jr; Phillips, Carla Rahn (1 July 2010). A Concise History of Spain. Cambridge University Press. ISBN 978-0-521-60721-6.
- Sénac, Philippe (2000). La frontière et les hommes, VIIIe-XIIe siècle: le peuplement musulman au nord de l'Èbre et les débuts de la reconquête aragonaise (in French). Maisonneuve et Larosse.
- Slane, Mac Guckin de (1845). Ibn Khallikan's Biographical Dictionary. Vol. 3. Paris: Oriental Translation Fund of Great Britain and Ireland.
- Souto, Juan A. (1989). "Sobre la génesis de la Calatayud islámica". Aragón en la Edad Media (in Spanish) (8): 675–696. ISSN 0213-2486.
- Terés, Elías (1957). "Linajes árabes en al-Andalus según la "Ŷamhara" de Ibn Ḥazm". Al-Andalus (in Spanish). 22: 55–112, 337–376.
- Turk, Afif (1972–1973). "El Reino de Zaragoza en el siglo XI de Cristo (V de Hégira)". Revista del Instituto Egipcio de Estudios Islámicos en Madrid (in Spanish). 17: 7–116.
- Vela Aulesa, Carles (2019). "L'Àndalus en la política de Barcelona i la Corona d'Aragó (segle XI-1213)". Tractats i negociacions diplomàtiques de Catalunya i de la Corona catalanoaragonesa a l'edat mitjana (in Catalan). Vol. I.2. Barcelona. pp. 117–180.
- Viguera, María Jesús; Corrient, Federico (1981). Crónica del Califa ʿAbdarraḥmān III an-Nāṣir Entre los Años 912 y 942 (Al-Muqtabis V) (in Spanish). Zaragoza: Instituto Hispano-Árabe de Cultura.
- Viguera, María Jesús (1991). "Los ʿAmiríes y la Marca Superior. Peculiaridades de una actuación singular". In Sénac, Philippe (ed.). La Marche supérieure d'al-Andalus et l'Occident chrétien (in Spanish). pp. 131–140.
