= Banu Hud =

Arab Muslim dynasty of Zaragoza (1039–1110) and ruled al-Andalus from 1228–1237

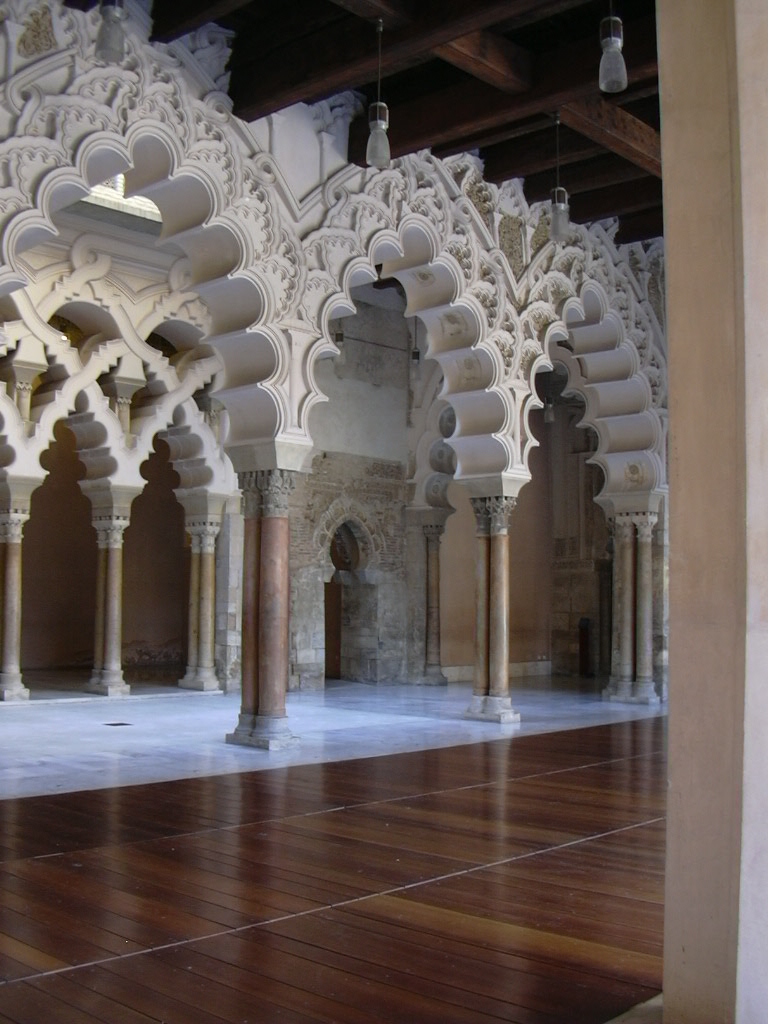
Detail of the Aljafería palace, constructed by Ahmad I al-Muqtadir.

The Banu Hud (Arabic: بنو هود Banū Hūd), also known as the Hudids or the Hudid dynasty, were an Arab dynasty that ruled the taifa of Zaragoza from 1039 until 1110.

The Hudid dynasty descends from Hud ibn Abd Allah ibn Musa ibn Salem al-Judhami (d. ca. 960).

In 1039, under the leadership of Al-Mustain I, Sulayman ibn Hud al-Judhami, the Bani Hud seized control of Zaragoza from a rival clan, the Banu Tujib. His heirs, particularly Ahmad I al-Muqtadir (1046–1081), Yusuf al-Mutamin (1081–1085), and Al-Mustain II, Ahmad ibn Yusuf (1085–1110), were patrons of culture and the arts. The Aljafería, the royal residence erected by Ahmad I, is practically the only palace from that period to have survived almost in its entirety.

Despite their independence, the Banu Hud were forced to recognize the superiority of the kingdom of Castile and pay parias to it as early as 1055. In 1086, they led the smaller kingdoms in their resistance to the Almoravids, who did not succeed in conquering Zaragoza until May 1110. The conquest represented the end of the dynasty. The last of the Banu Hud, Imad al-Dawl Abd al-Malik (Abdelmalik) Al Hud, the last king of Zaragoza, forced to abandon his capital, allied himself with the Christian kingdom of Aragon under Alfonso the Battler, who in 1118 reconquered the city for the Christians and made it the capital of Aragon.

The last king's son, Zafadola (Sayf al-Dawla), had some territorial authority before being killed by Christians during a battle.

Between 1228 and 1237, most of al-Andalus was controlled by Ibn Hud, who claimed descent from the Banu Hud.

== See also ==
- Taifa of Zaragoza
- Taifa of Seville
- Taifa of Cordoba
- The Reconquista (8th–15th century)
