= Taifa of Zaragoza =

Muslim state (1013–1110)

- 1013–1110
- Taifa Kingdom of Zaragoza, c. 1080
- Capital: Zaragoza
- Common languages: Arabic, Mozarabic, Hebrew, Berber
- Religion: Islam, Christianity (Mozarabic Rite), Judaism
- Government: Monarchy
- Historical era: Middle Ages
  - Downfall of Caliphate of Cordoba: 1013
  - Conquered by the Almoravids: 1110
- Currency: Dirham and Dinar
Preceded by	Succeeded by
Caliphate of Córdoba	Almoravid dynasty
- Today part of: Spain

The taifa of Zaragoza (Arabic: طائفة سرقسطة) was an independent Arab Muslim state in the east of Al-Andalus (present-day Spain) with its capital in Saraqusta (Zaragoza) city. It was established in the early 11th century as one of the many Taifa kingdoms that followed the collapse of the Caliphate of Córdoba around this time. It survived until 1110, when it was annexed by the Almoravids.

== History ==
During the first part of this period (1013–1038), the city was ruled by the Arab Banu Tujib tribe. They were replaced by the Arab Banu Hud rulers, who had to deal with a complicated alliance with El Cid of Valencia and his Castilian masters against the Almoravids, who managed to bring the Taifas Emirates under their control. After the death of El Cid, his kingdom was conquered by the Almoravids, and by 1100 they had crossed the Ebro into Barbastro, which brought them into direct confrontation with Aragon.

The Banu Hud stubbornly resisted the Almoravid dynasty and ruled until they were eventually defeated by the Almoravids in May 1110. The last sultan of the Banu Hud, Abd-al-Malik, and Imad ad-Dawla of Saraqusta, were forced to abandon the capital. Abd-al-Malik allied himself with the Christian Aragonese under Alfonso I of Aragon and from then on the Muslim soldiers of Saraqusta served in the Aragonese forces. Soon afterwards (1118) a good deal of the old taifa, including the city of Zaragoza, was conquered by the Christian kingdom of Aragon, and remained in Christian hands thereafter.

Between c. 1040 and c. 1105, the Taifa of Lérida was separate from that of Zaragoza.

== List of rulers ==
This list is taken from a list compiled by A. García-Sanjuán in The Routledge Handbook of Muslim Iberia:

Tujibid dynasty:

- Al-Mundhir ibn Yahya al-Tujibi: c. 1013–1021/2
- Yahya ibn al-Mundhir: 1021/2–1036
- Al-Mundhir ibn Yahya: 1036–1038/9
- Abd Allah ibn al-Hakam al-Tujibi: 1038/9

Huddid dynasty:

- Al-Musta'in I: 1038/9–1046
- Ahmad al-Muqtadir: 1046–1081/3
- Yusuf al-Mu'taman ibn Hud: 1081/3–1085
- Al-Musta'in II: 1085–1110
- 'Abd al-Malik Imad ad-Dawla: 1110

== See also ==
- History of Islam
- History of Spain
- List of Sunni Muslim dynasties
