= Ship burial =

Burial in which a ship or boat is used

A ship burial or boat grave is a burial in which a ship or boat is used either as the tomb for the dead and the grave goods, or as a part of the grave goods itself. If the ship is very small, it is called a boat grave. This style of burial was practiced by various seafaring cultures in Asia and Europe. Notable ship burial practices include those by the Germanic peoples, particularly by Viking Age Norsemen, as well as the pre-colonial ship burials described in the Boxer Codex (c. 15th century) in the Philippines.

== Asia-Pacific ==
=== China ===
The extinct Bo people of China's Sichuan and Yunnan provinces are known for their hanging coffins.

The ancestors of the Bo people were instrumental in helping the Western Zhou overthrow the ruling Yin at the end of the Shang dynasty. Apart from this, the Bo people differed from other ethnic minorities in China through their burial traditions. Instead of the more common burial on the ground, the coffins of the Bo people were found hanging on cliffs. These coffins were also boat-shaped. Grave goods found in the coffins included blue and white porcelain bowls dating back to the Ming dynasty, an iron knife, another smaller knife and two iron spear points. The Bo people were massacred by the Imperial Army in the later years of the Ming dynasty, and those who survived changed their names in order to escape oppression. Scenes of the typical daily life of the Bo people can also be seen through the cliff and wall paintings they have left behind.

In the area of Sichuan several boat-shaped coffins have been found and dated to the Eastern Zhou Period (770–255 BC). The tombs also contain a large amount of ritual objects.

=== Japan ===
A boat-shaped coffin was found in Japan during the construction of the Kita Ward in Nagoya. This coffin was found to be older than any other previously found in Japan. Another boat-shaped coffin was found in the tomb of the Ohoburo Minami Kofun-gun in Northern Kyoto, dated to the latter half of the Yayoi Period (4 BC–4 AD). The tomb contained grave goods including a cobalt blue glass bangle, an iron bangle, and several iron swords. Boat-shaped coffins called haniwa were more common during the Kofun period, and these coffins were seen in paintings along with the representation of the sun, moon, and the stars. This suggests the ritual symbols associated with boats even in Japan.

=== Philippines ===
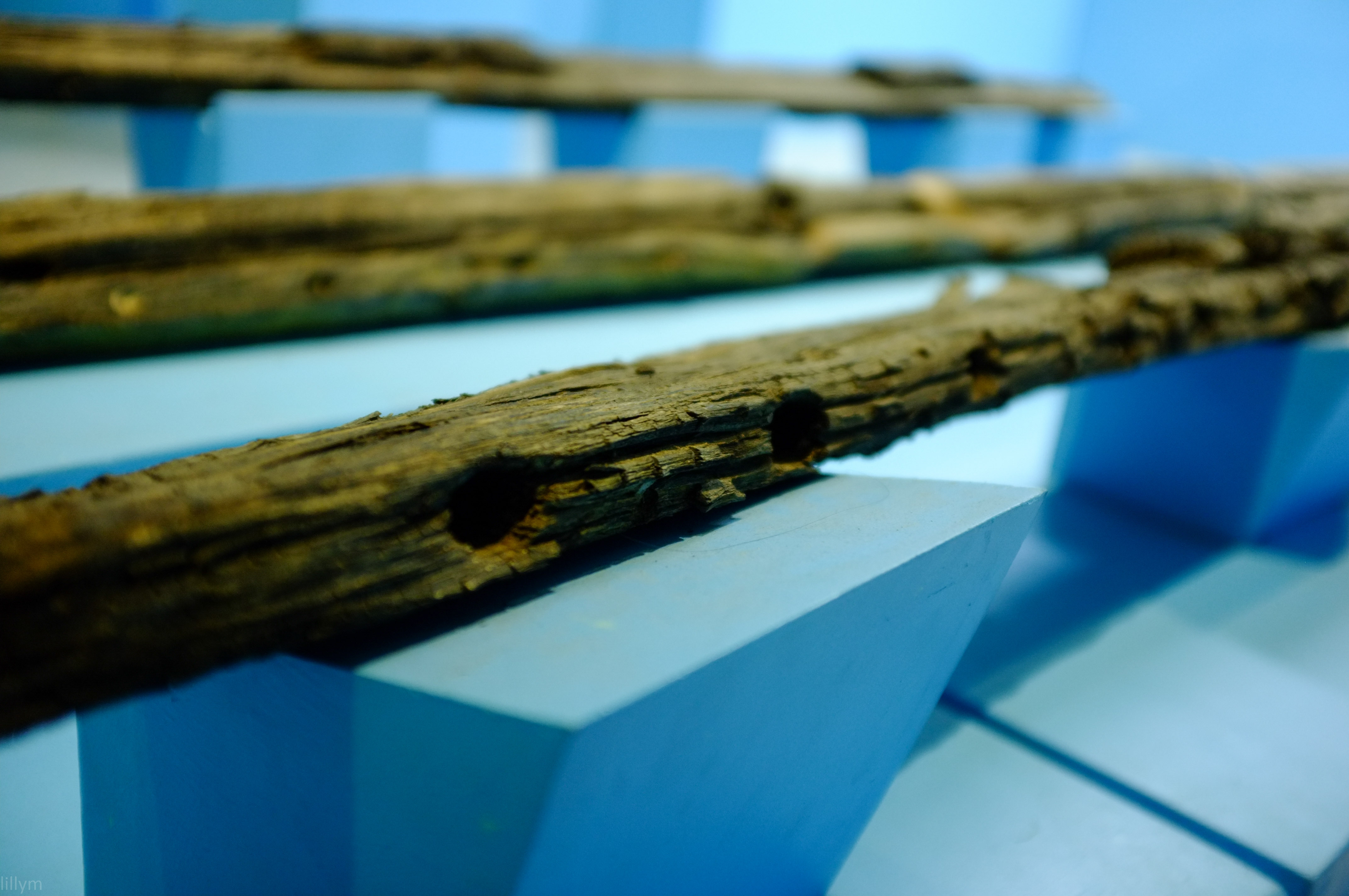
Planks from one of the Butuan boats (c. 689 to 988 AD) from the Philippines

There are numerous burial sites in the Philippines that include boat burials and boat-shaped burials. In fact, present-day coffins in the Philippines still resemble canoes made from hollowed out logs. There are two famous sites of burials, the jar burials in Batanes and in Catanauan. The burial markers in Batanes are shaped like a boat, with the bow and stern appearing prominently. The markers were made from stone, and were made to appear like the outline of the traditional boat tataya. Inspection of the Chuhangin and Nakamaya sites in Batanes reveals that the markers were oriented in a Northwest-Southeast direction. Principal site investigators also discovered that the bow of the markers pointed towards the sea. But apparently, when the storms cease to pound on the islands of Batanes, the bow of the boats align with the appearance of the band of the Milky Way Galaxy. This further increases the possibility that the burials were made to align with the cosmos in the belief that the boats would carry the dead to the heavens and the stars.

Some 1500 kilometers from Batanes, the Tuhian beach in Catanauan, Quezon lies another boat-shaped burial site. The boats in Catanauan are also oriented in a Northwest-Southeast direction, with the bow pointing towards the sea. The only difference is that the markers in Batanes were made from andesite and limestone, while those present in Catanauan were made from coral slabs. Also, while the markers in Batanes contained a single burial, the Catanauan markers contained multiple burials.

The alignment of both of these burial sites served as evidence that people from both sites believed in the idea of the afterlife. Also, the boats were thought as a vessel for "sailing" to the heavens and the stars. This belief is a widespread idea all around the world, as we know from different burial sites all throughout Europe, the Americas and Asia.

Another burial site in Bohol was observed by the Spanish during the 16th century. One account of the burial states:

"In some places, they kill slaves and bury them with their masters in order to serve them in the afterlife, this practice is carried out to the extent that many load a ship with more than sixty slaves, fill it up with food and drink, place the dead on board, and the entire vessel including live slaves buried in the earth."

Perhaps the most famous boat-shaped burial found in the Philippines is the Manunggul Jar. The jars were excavated from a Neolithic burial site in Manunggul cave of Tabon Caves at Lipuun Point at Palawan. The jars were found to be from 890–710 BC. The main feature of the Manunggul jar is the two human figures seated on a boat at the top handle of its cover. The figures represent the journey of the soul to the afterlife, with another figure serving as his oarsman.

The burial jar with a cover featuring a ship-of-the-dead […] is perhaps unrivaled in Southeast Asia; the work of an artist and master potter. This vessel provides a clear example of a cultural link between the archaeological past and the ethnographic present. The boatman […] is steering rather than paddling the "ship". The mast of the boat was not recovered. Both figures appear to be wearing bands tied over the crowns of their heads and under their jaws; a pattern still found in burial practices among the indigenous peoples in the Southern Philippines. The manner in which the hands of the front figure are folded across the chest is also a widespread practice in the islands when arranging the corpse.

The carved prow and the eye motif of the spirit boat is still found on the traditional watercraft of the Sulu Archipelago, Borneo, and Malaysia. Similarities in the execution of the ears, eyes, nose, and mouth of the figures may be seen today in the wood carving of Taiwan, the Philippines, and elsewhere in Southeast Asia.

=== Vietnam ===
The Dong Son culture in Vietnam is known by archaeologists due to a great concentration of boat-shaped coffins. 171 boat-shaped coffins were recovered from 44 sites in Vietnam, and most of these were found from Dong Son sites. Some of these burials included carefully arranged grave goods inside the coffin along with the corpse of the dead. Also, the coffins were found strategically close to water, either rivers or small streams of sea.

== Europe ==
Ship burials were a traditional practice in Europe. Specifically, in Northern Europe, Viking ship burials are impressive finds, as they are a significant source of information about the Viking Age and the historical character of those who lived during that time. Viking ship graves were laid out in a costly fashion, and practiced for both men and women of the time.

A traditional Viking ship prepared for burial contained the body of whomever owned the ship, which would then be set on fire in a funeral pyre on land or buried whole. In Norse mythology, boats were a symbol of safe passage to the afterlife, similar to the role they played in the Vikings' lives.

A unique eyewitness account of a 10th-century ship burial among the Volga Vikings is given by Arab traveller Ibn Fadlan. The largest Viking ship grave, 65 feet (20 m) long, was discovered in Norway by archeologists in 2018, and it is estimated to have been covered over 1000 years ago to be used as a boat grave for an eminent Viking king or queen.

=== Northern Europe ===
==== Scandinavia ====
- Myklebust from Nordfjordeid in Stad, Norway. The only ship cremation grave in Scandinavia. First excavated in 1874, then again in 2024.
- Herlaug in Leka Municipality, Norway – a 60-metre (200 ft) high tumulus. The presumed ship burial is the earliest in Scandinavia, dated by dendrochronology to c. 700 AD.
- Ladby – from Kerteminde on the island of Funen, Denmark
- Gokstad – from Kongshaugen, Vestfold, Norway
- Oseberg – from Oseberg farm near Tønsberg in Vestfold, Norway
- Tune – from Haugen farm on Rolvsøy in Tune Municipality, Østfold, Norway
- Gjellestad – from the farm of the same name in Halden Municipality, Norway; excavations ongoing as of June 2020.

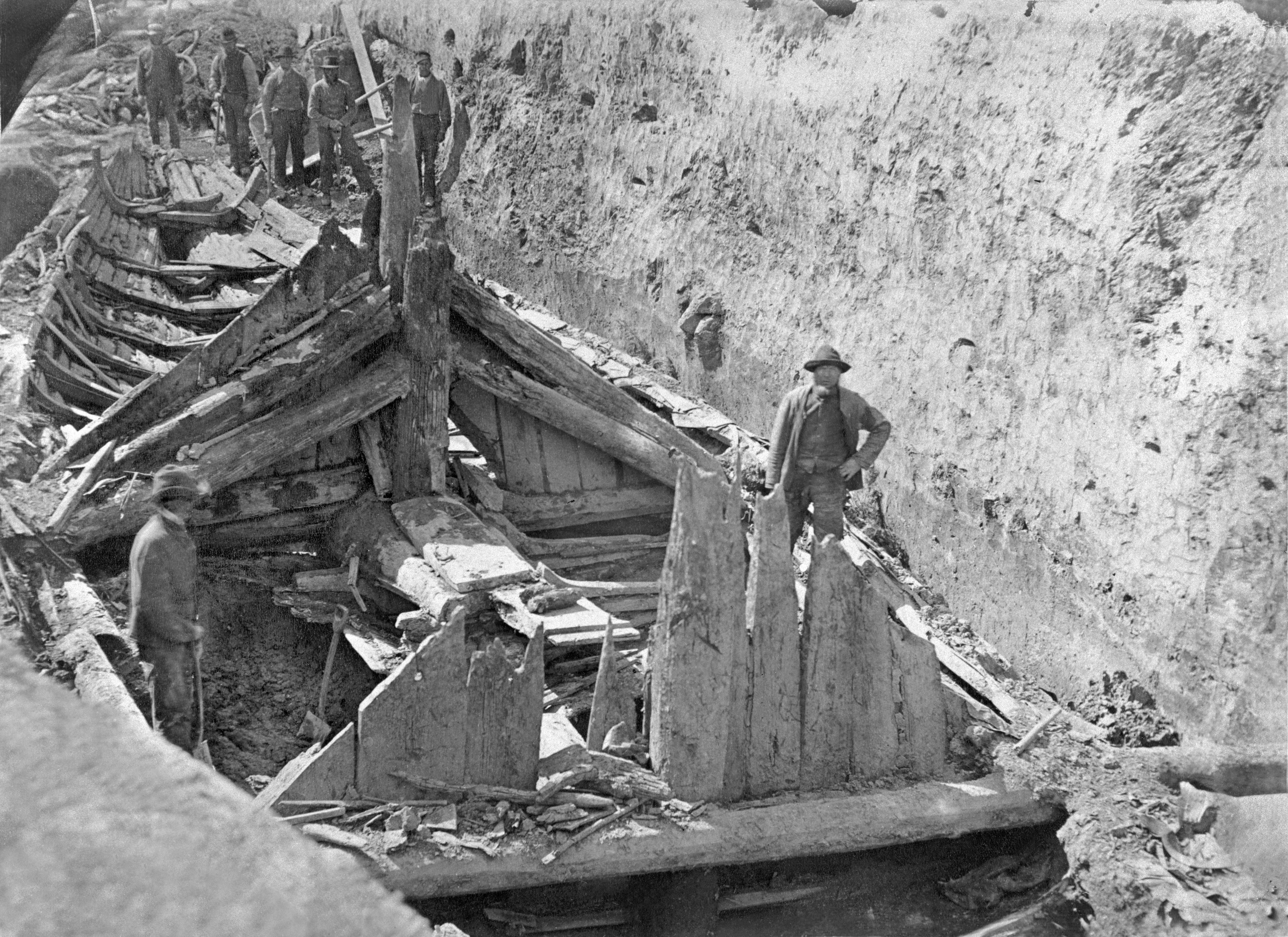
Excavation of the Gokstad Ship burial in Norway

The Gokstad Ship burial– from Kongshaugen, Vestfold, Norway, discovered in 1880, is the largest preserved Viking ships in Norway. The ship was found by archeologist Nicolay Nicolaysen, who had discovered an unsanctioned archeological dig endeavor on Gokstad farm, which the two sons of the owner of the farm's owner were responsible for. When Nicolaysen's team arrived at the site, they soon began a state-sponsored excavation. It only took two days for part of the boat's wooden structure to surface, revealing what would be one of the most remarkable Viking archeological discoveries ever made.

The ship measures an astonishing 76 by 17.5 feet, with a mast, fittings for one large sail, and its outside embellished by altering black and yellow shields. Inside, a chieftain was found in a burial chamber within the ships mast, surrounded by a variety of spectacular group of objects placed with the intention of providing relaxation and enjoyment in his journey to the afterlife. Additionally, the archeologists discovered the remains of different animals buried within, such as horses, dogs, peacocks, and goshawks. Dendrochronology suggests that the wood used for the ship was cut down in around 890. The ship is spacious, with a full deck across its interior, and is large enough for a crew of thirty to forty men.

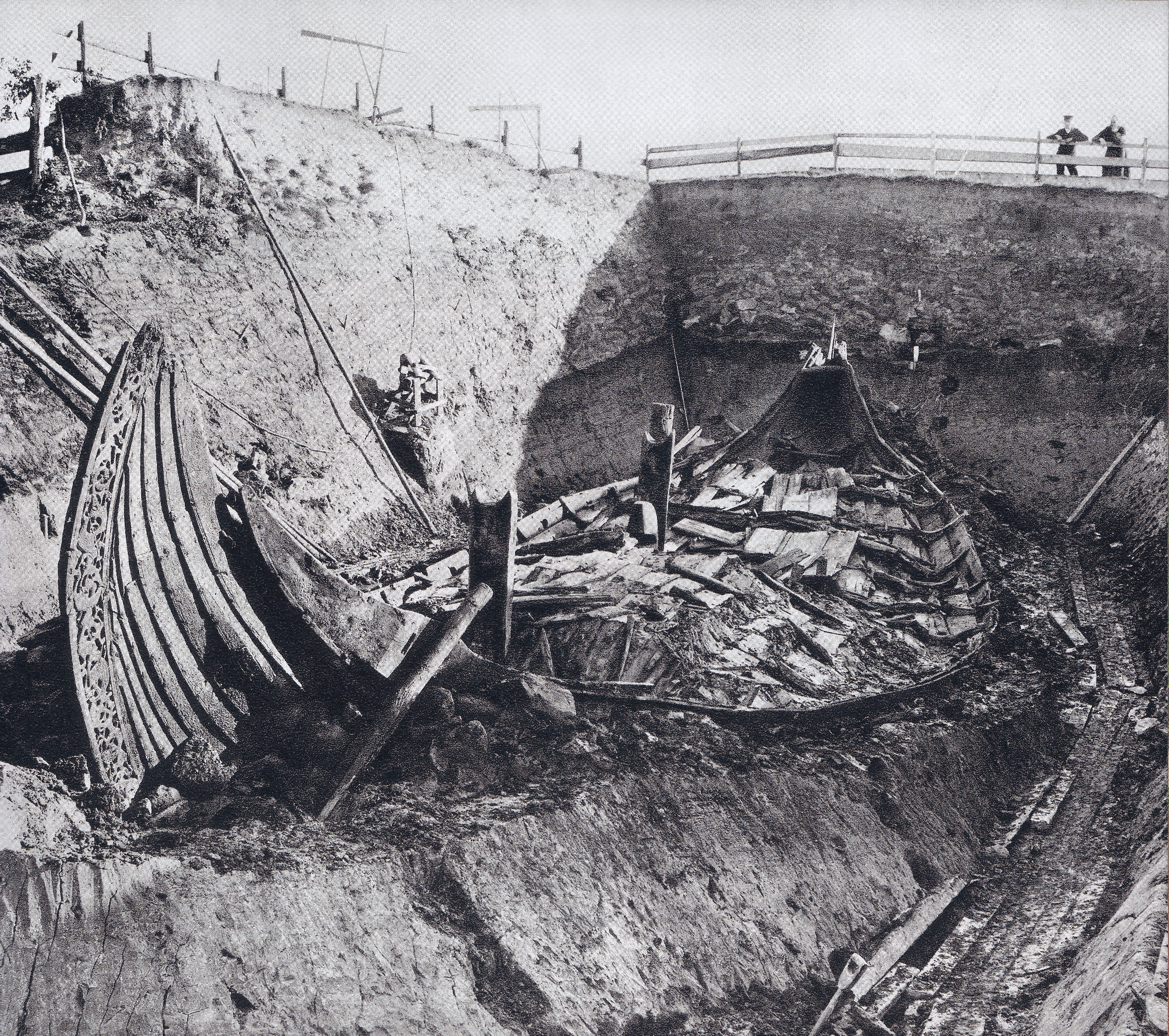
Excavation of the Oseberg Ship burial mound in Norway

Another well preserved viking ship, The Oseberg Ship– from Oseberg farm near Tønsberg in Vestfold, Norway, was found in 1904 by Gabriel Gustafson . The burial was covered with a 40 meter wide and more than 6 meter high mound of stone, clay and turf, and consisted of a 21.5 meter long ship with a tent-shaped, timber-built and 5.6 meter long burial chamber erected immediately aft of amidships. The ship and grave goods are unusually well preserved because of the blue clay in which it was buried.

In the early Middle Ages, robbers broke into the mound and reached the burial chamber, leaving the grave disturbed by the time archeologists discovered it in 1904. However, most of the rich equipment was preserved and found in the forefront of the ship, including: three beds, two tents, a richly decorated cart, three sleighs and a work sled, and elegantly carved sleigh shafts. Additionally, the skeletons of at least 10 horses and an ox were found. The Oseberg Ship burial is one of the few ship burials for women, and the two individuals found were thought to have been 50 and 80 years old. Some of the personal possessions of the women were also discovered, such as implements for textile work, chests, and four intricately carved animal heads.

==== British Isles ====
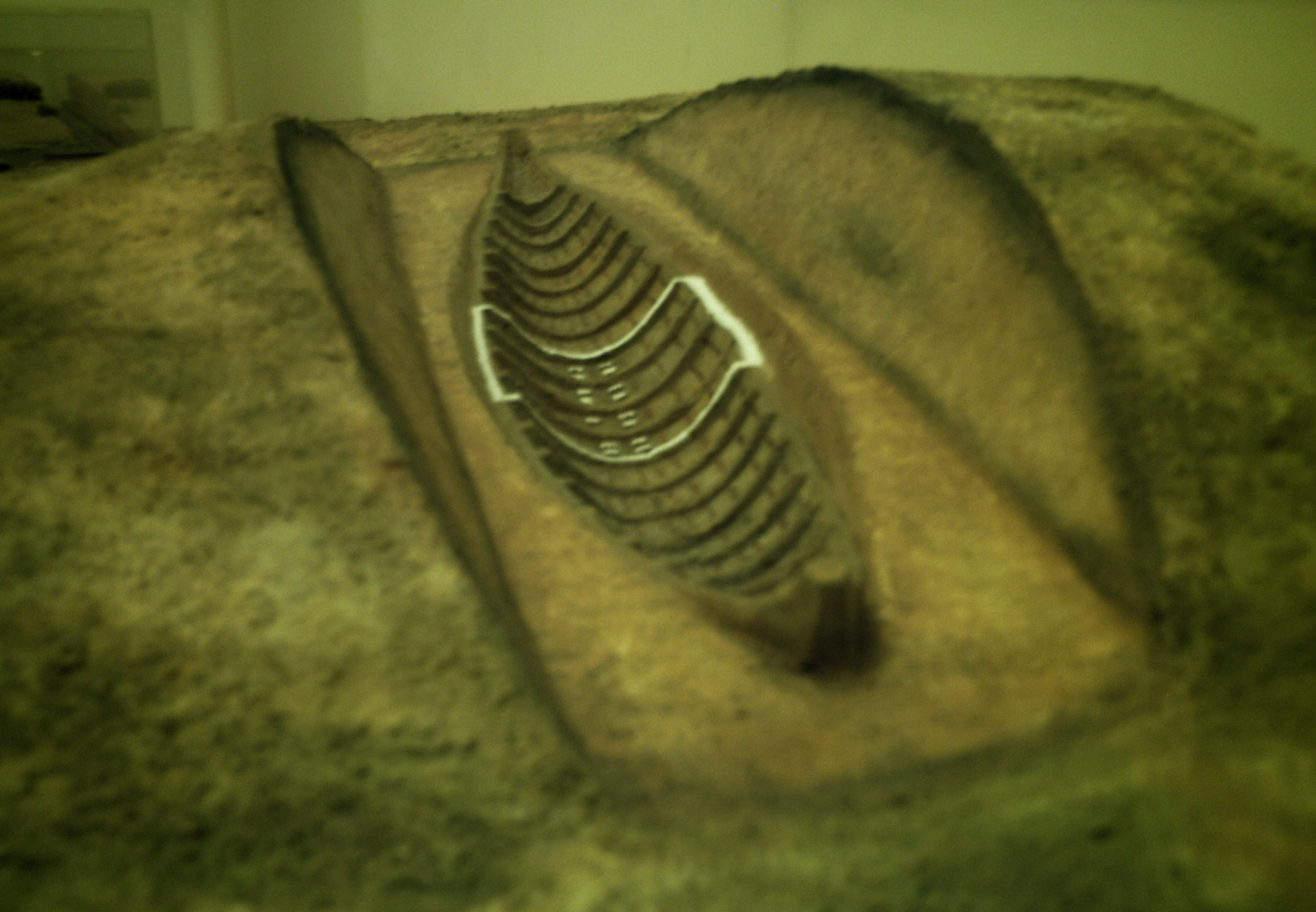
Model of the structure of the Sutton Hoo ship (c. 7th century AD) it might have appeared, with chamber area outlined

- Snape – Anglo-Saxon burial from Snape Common in Suffolk
- Sutton Hoo – Anglo-Saxon burial site near Woodbridge, Suffolk
- Balladoole and Knock y Doonee – Viking burials in the Isle of Man
- Port an Eilean Mhòir – The only Viking ship burial yet discovered in mainland Britain, the mound was found in 2006 and excavated in 2011.
- The Scar boat burial – a Viking burial found on Sanday, one of the Orkney Islands.

==== Baltic countries ====
- Salme ships – from the island of Saaremaa, Estonia

=== Eastern Europe ===
- Ryurikovo Gorodishche – on an island on the Volkhov River near Veliky Novgorod, Russia
- Sarskoye Gorodishche – from a medieval fortified settlement in Yaroslavl Oblast, Russia
- Timerevo – from site near the village of Bolshoe Timeryovo, Yaroslavl, Russia
- Black Grave – from the largest burial mound in Chernihiv, Ukraine

=== Western Europe ===
- Solleveld – south of The Hague. Late sixth century. The only boat grave in the Netherlands.
- Fallward – north of Bremerhaven, Germany. Fifth century
- Groix, an island in the south of Brittany, France. Tenth century

== See also ==
- Ímar Ua Donnubáin, legendary Irish navigator of partial Norse descent
- Stone ship
- Tombs of boat-shaped coffins
- Chariot burial (Iron Age tradition)
- Solar barge (Bronze Age tradition)
- Khufu ship (Ancient Egypt)
