= Gnezdovo =

Archaeological site in Smolensk Oblast, Russia

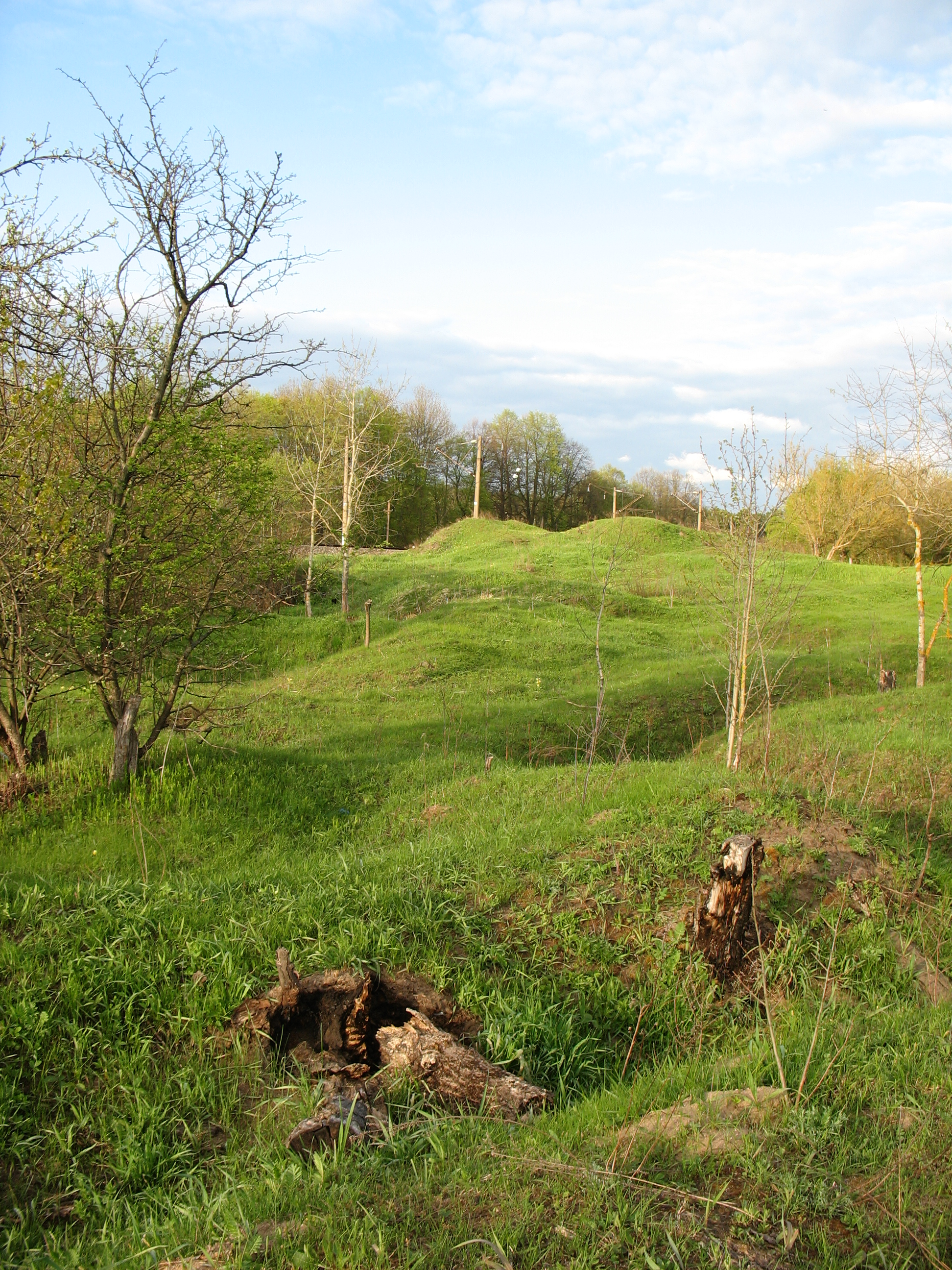
- The Gnezdovo kurgans.

- Location in Russia Location in Russia's Smolensk Oblast
- 54°47′5″N 31°52′46″E
- Type: Settlement
- Location: Smolensk Oblast, Russia

Site notes
- Condition: In ruins

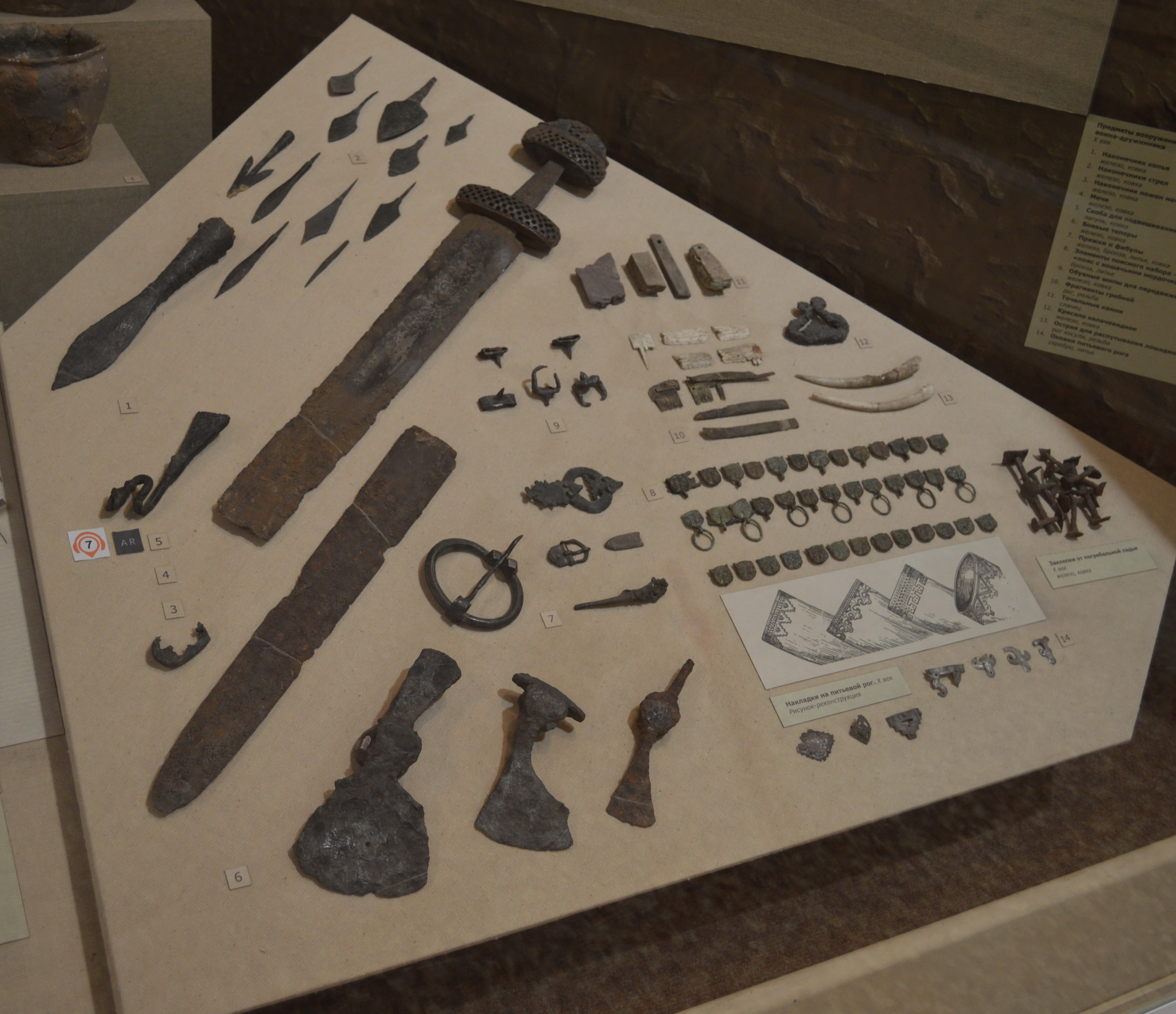
Archaeological artefacts from Gnezdovo kurgans

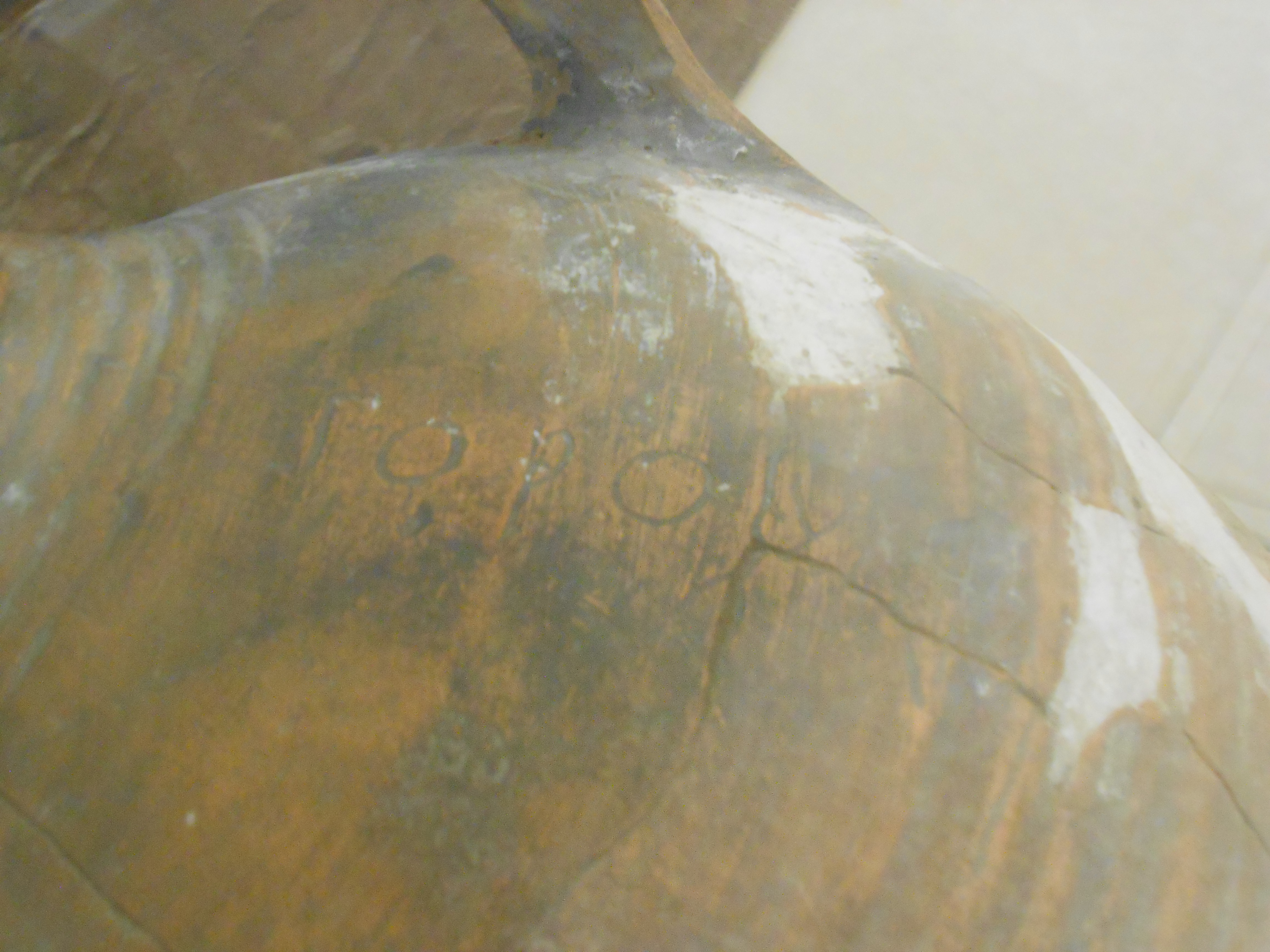
Amphora with Cyrillic inscription

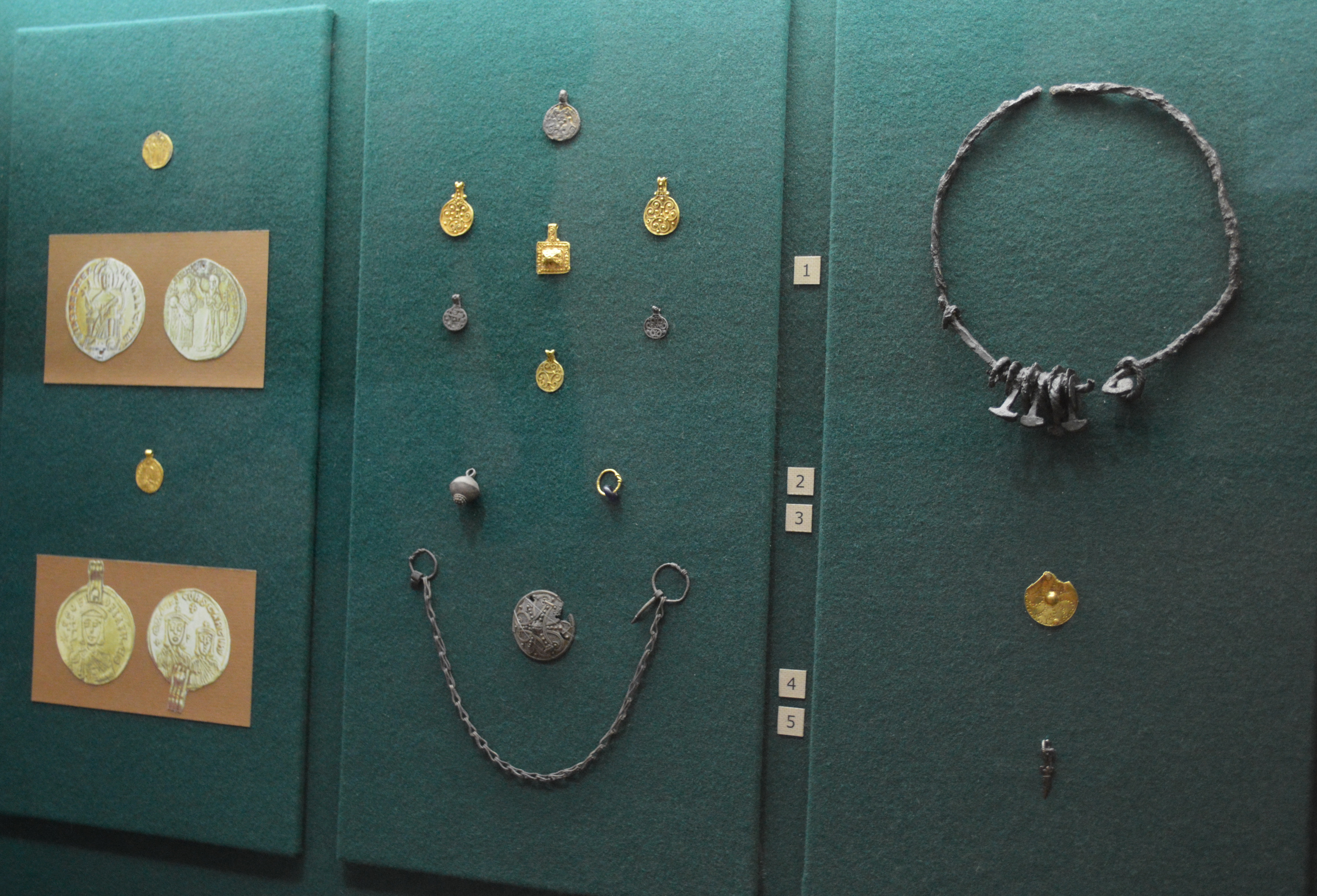
Byzantine coins and Scandinavian jewellery from Gnezdovo

Gnezdovo or Gnyozdovo (Russian: Гнёздово) is an archaeological site located near the village of Gnyozdovo in Smolensky District, Smolensk Oblast, Russia. The site contains extensive remains of a Slavic-Varangian settlement that flourished in the 10th century as a major trade station on the trade route from the Varangians to the Greeks.

== Site ==
The archaeological site comprises a "citadel" (gorodishche) (Russian: Городище), formerly situated at the confluence of the Rivers Dnieper and Svinets, and a ring of ancient rural settlements (selitba) which occupy an area of 17.5 hectares, of which roughly 5,000 square metres (54,000 sq ft) had been excavated by the end of the 20th century. This makes the site one of the largest survivals of the Viking Age in Europe: only Hedeby covered a larger territory (24 hectares), with the sites of Birka (13 hectares), Dublin (12 hectares), Ribe (10 hectares), and Gdańsk (1 hectare) trailing behind. There are about 3,000 burial mounds arranged in eight clusters of kurgans. Of these, about 1,300 mounds have been explored by Russian and Soviet archaeologists, starting in 1874.

There is some disagreement among scholars as to which ethnic element predominated at Gnyozdovo. Although a Varangian presence is pronounced, nineteen mounds out of twenty contain ordinary burials of Krivichs and Baltic men and women. The burial rite is mostly cremation. The most numerous finds are household utensils and pottery. As a general observation, the Gnyozdovo tumuli have parallels with the "druzhina kurgans" of Chernigov, such as the Black Grave.

== Finds ==
The site at Gnezdovo first drew the attention of archaeologists in 1867 during the construction of the Orel-Vitebsk railway when a hoard was discovered containing 10th century silver ornaments. Proper archaeological investigation of the site began in 1874 by M.F. Kustsinsky. In the late nineteenth century V.I. Sizov excavated several hundred burial mounds. Archaeological investigation of the site is ongoing.

Seven hoards of Byzantine and Arabic coins (more than 1,100 of the latter) and a Byzantine dish bearing an image of Simargl have shown that the local community carried on a prosperous trade along the Dnieper. The metal objects represented include hauberks (not typical for Scandinavian sites), helmets, battle-axes, Carolingian swords, and arrows. Among the more surprising discoveries were an early folding razor with a copper handle and a pivoted scissors, probably the earliest found in Eastern Europe.

The most unexpected discovery at Gnyozdovo was a Kerch amphora with the earliest inscription attested in the Old East Slavic. The excavator has inferred that the word горушна (gorušna), inscribed on the pot in Cyrillic letters, designates mustard that was kept there. This explanation has not been universally accepted and the inscription seems to be open to different interpretations. The dating of the inscription to the mid-10th century (Note: The latest coins found in the same burial go back to 295 AH, i.e. to 906/907 AD.) suggests a hitherto unsuspected popularity of the Cyrillic script in pre-Christian Rus. (Note: Of the three Runic inscriptions found in ancient Rus, only one, from Ladoga, predates the Gnyozdovo inscription.)

== Historical background ==
As Tatiana Jackson has observed, Norse sagas contain more detailed information about the Western Dvina (Norse: Dyna) than about any other river of Eastern Europe. This fact highlights a great importance attached to the Dvina trade route by the Vikings. Written evidence that directly mentions Gnezdovo is very sparse and vague, with only two entries coming from the Primary Chronicle and one from the De Administrando Imperio.

Gnyozdovo is situated downstream from the Dvina–Dnieper portages, at a point where the Svinets and several small waterways empty into the Dnieper. Like Smolensk at a later period, Gnyozdovo flourished through trade along the Dnieper going south to Constantinople and north over portages to the Dvina and the Lovat, two rivers allowing access to the Baltic Sea. (Note: A Slavonic chronicle reports that an important portage existed between the Lovat River and the Dnieper.) At the time of its establishment, the local citadel served a defensive function against possible attacks on the portages, where the Norse traders would be at their most vulnerable. After internal tensions within Kievan Rus settled down, the site of Gnyozdovo "formed the critical exchange centre and refitting base on the route from the Baltic to the Black Sea".

The settlement declined in the early years of the 11th century, simultaneously with other Varangian trade stations in Eastern Europe. By the end of the century, Gnyozdovo's importance as a trade centre had been completely supplanted by nearby Smolensk.

== Gnyozdovo and Smolensk ==
Scholars are not in agreement as to how Gnyozdovo is related to Smolensk (Norse: Smaleskja), situated at the confluence of the Dnieper and the Smolnya Rivers.

According to one point of view, Gnyozdovo was the functional and economic predecessor of modern Smolensk. Soviet archaeologists established that the earliest settlement on the site of Smolensk goes back to the early 11th century. In other words, the emergence of Smolensk coincides with the decline of Gnyozdovo. The regional centre could have been moved from Gnyozdovo to Smolensk at some point following the Christianisation of Rus by Vladimir the Great.

Another school of thought is represented by Petrukhin and Pushkina who maintain that Smolensk and Gnyozdovo peacefully coexisted throughout the 10th century. According to this version, Gnyozdovo was a pogost of the ruling Kievan monarch which he used to levy tribute from the Krivichs. Since the knyaz's druzhina was composed primarily of the Norsemen, a substantial Varangian presence at Gnyozdovo seems to be well motivated. Concurrently, Smolensk was an urban centre of the Slavic (Krivich) population, where the regional veche was held. After Vladimir the Great established a local principality for his son, the administrative centre of the region and the seat of princely power was moved from Gnyozdovo to Smyadyn Castle near Smolensk. (Note: This residence of the Smolensk princes is first recorded under year 1015 in the Life of Sts. Boris and Gleb, attributed to Nestor the Chronicler.)

The dichotomy of a Slavic veche centre and a Varangian druzhina station has parallels in other areas of Rus: compare Novgorod and Holmsgard, Chernigov and Shestovitsa, Rostov and Sarskoye Gorodishche, Yaroslavl and Timeryovo. In later centuries, the ruling princes from the House of Rurik preferred to settle in a fortified castle at a distance from their capital: in Vyshhorod rather than Kiev, in Smyadyn rather than Smolensk, in Kideksha rather than Suzdal, in Bogolyubovo rather than Vladimir.

== Nomenclature ==
The place-name Gnyozdovo seems to be a late medieval derivation from the Slavic word for "nest". It is first recorded in the 17th-century documents. Historians disagree as to what was the earlier name of the settlement. Those who view Gnyozdovo as the antecedent of Smolensk, believe that the name of Smolensk originally applied to Gnyozdovo. According to them, Constantine VII referred to the site of Gnyozdovo when he mentioned the fortress of Smolensk in De Administrando Imperio. The Primary Chronicle records Smolensk even earlier, in connection with Askold and Dir's raid against Kiev in 867.

Vasmer and other etymologists derive the name of Smolensk from the Smolnya River. If so, the original Slavic name for Gnyozdovo must have been different. Tatiana Jackson theorizes that it may have been derived from the name of the Svinets River, reconstructing it as Svinechsk (Свинеческъ). As the name of the river seems to be related to the Russian word for "swine" and ancient Gnyozdovo was situated on a promontory, Jackson identified this settlement with Sýrnes ("swine promontory" in Old Norse), one of seven or eight cities of Gardariki listed in the Norse geographical treatise of Hauksbók.
