= Jean-Armand =

Jean-Armand is a French masculine given name. Notable people with the name include:

== People ==
- Jean-Armand Dieskau, Baron de Dieskau, birth name of Jean Erdman, Baron Dieskau (1701–1767), German-born French general and commander
- Jean-Armand de Bessuéjouls Roquelaure (1721–1818), French Roman Catholic prelate
- Jean-Armand de Joyeuse, Marquis de Grandpré (1631–1710), French general, soldier and marshal
- Jean-Armand du Peyrer, Comte de Troisville (1598–1672), French military officer
- Jean-Armand Lacoste, birth name of Saint-Amand (writer) (1797–1885), French playwright

== See also ==
- Armand David (1826–1900; born Jean-Pierre-Armand David), French-Basque Lazarist missionary Catholic priest, zoologist and botanist
- Armand Jean d'Allonville (1732–1811), French nobleman
- Armand Jean de Vignerot du Plessis, 2nd Duke of Richelieu (1629–1715), French nobleman and naval officer
- Armand Jean-François (1874–1938), French Guadeloupean politician
- Armand Jean le Bouthillier de Rancé (1626–1700), French author, abbot and founder of the Trappist Order
- Armand Guillaumin (1841–1927; born Jean-Baptiste Armand Guillaumin), French painter
- Armand Kohl (1845–1928; second name Jean), French engraver and illustrator
- Armand Vergeaud (1876–1949; born Jean Antoine Armand Vergeaud), French painter
- Cardinal Richelieu (1585–1642; born Armand Jean du Plessis, 1st Duke of Richelieu), French Roman Catholic prelate and statesman
- Gaston Cougny (1857–1908; born Antoine Jean Armand Gaston Cougny), French lawyer and historian
- Gustave Buchard (1890–1977; second and third names Jean Armand), French fencer
- Jean Armand de Lestocq (1692–1767), French adventurer and court physician
- Jean Armand de Maillé, 2nd Marquis of Brézé (1619–1646), French admiral; uncle of Cardinal Richelieu
- Jean Armand Charlemagne (1753–1838), French writer
- Jean Armand Isidore Pancher (1814–1877), French gardener and botanist
- Jean-Baptiste Élie de Beaumont (1798–1874; second name Armand), French geologist
- Jean-Jules-Armand Colbert (1663–1704), French general, noblemen, Master of Ceremonies and military officer
- Jean Louis Armand de Quatrefages de Bréau (1810–1892), French biologist, physician, zoologist and anthropologist
- Philippe Étancelin (1896–1981; second and third names Jean Armand), French racing driver
- JA (disambiguation)
