= Dyakovo culture =

Iron Age archaeological culture

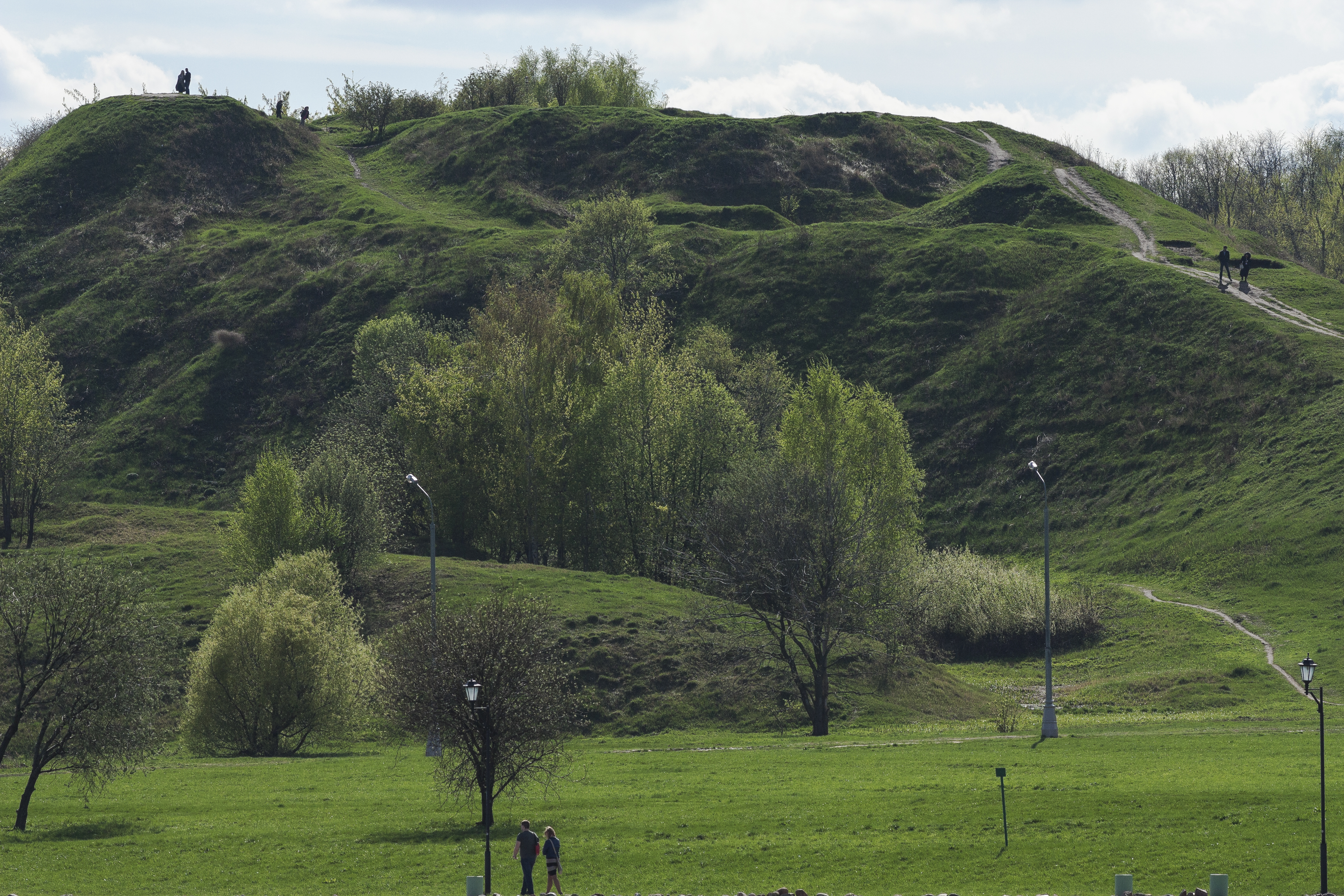
- Dyakovo hillfort, Moscow
- Period: Iron Age
- Type site: Dyakovo hillfort
- Preceded by: Kazan culture; Pozdnyakovo culture
- Followed by: Meryans
- Defined by: A. Spitsyn (1903)

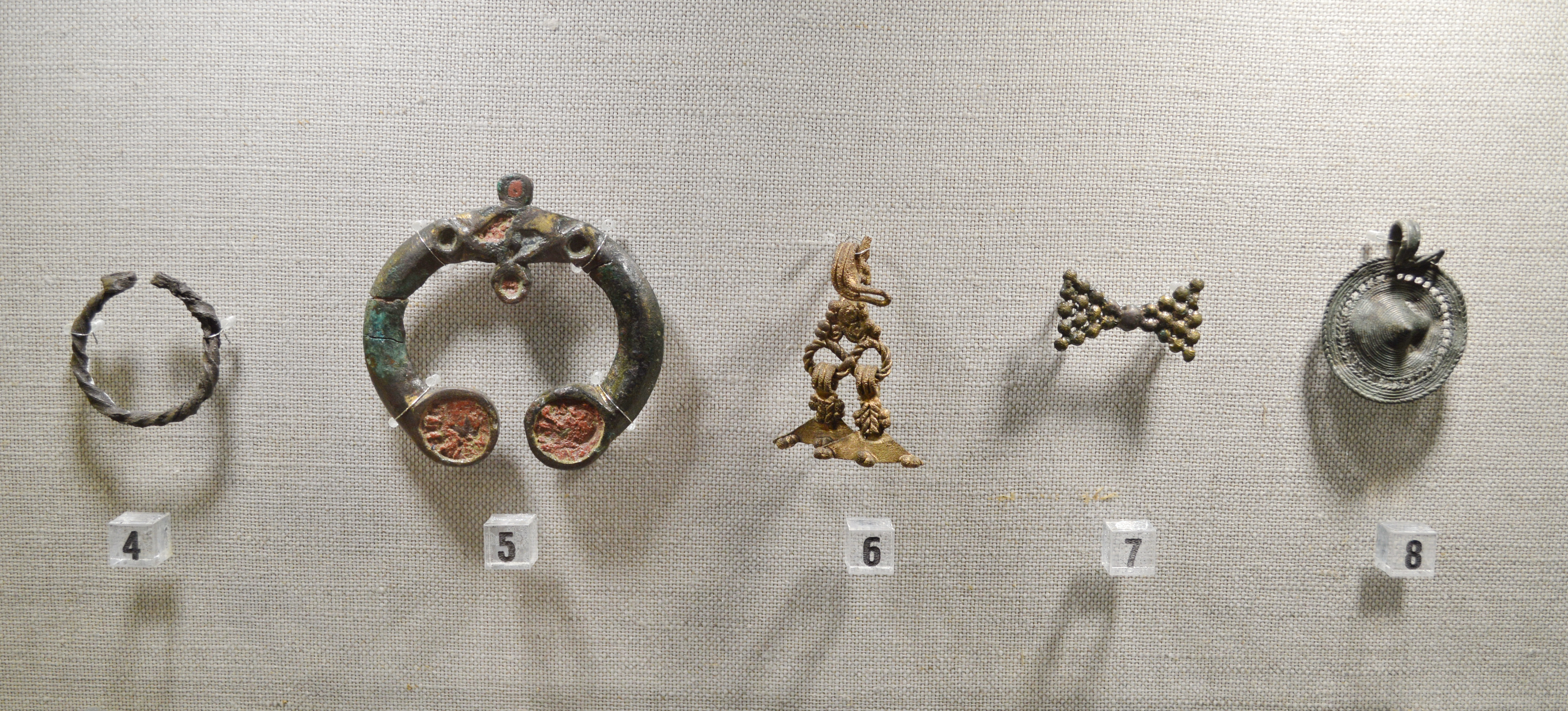
Dyakovo culture jewelry

The Dyakovo culture (Russian: Дьяковская культура) is an Iron Age archaeological culture in central-western Russia, associated with the Moskva, Oka, and Volga rivers.

Dyakovo is one of the oldest Finno-Ugric archaeological cultures known. Scholars have disagreed on whether Baltic influence predominated in the late 1st millennium.

== Chronology ==
The dating of the Dyakovo culture, particularly its end point, has been subject to academic debate. Finds from a wide chronological range have been assigned to the culture, including the Starshaya Kashira hillfort (7th–4th centuries BC), the Ogubskoje site (1st–5th centuries AD), and finds dated to the later 1st millennium AD in the mid-20th century. The 5th–3rd centuries BC and the 1st–4th centuries AD were periods of significant population growth.

Archaeologist K. A. Smirnov divides the Dyakovo culture into several periods:

- Late 8th–early 7th centuries BC: Settlements on high riverbanks emerged during this time. The period is associated with comb-decorated chequered ceramics and bone tools.
- 7th–3rd centuries BC: Associated with chequered ceramics decorated throughout with stamping techniques. A small amount of metal tools, some imported, appear in the archaeological record.
- 3rd century BC–2nd century AD: Development of agricultural techniques led to wealth accumulation and new settlement patterns. Undecorated pottery became more dominant over chequered pottery, and metal tools became significantly more widespread.
- 3rd–6th centuries AD: Pottery was predominantly plain. Chequered pottery disappeared, and new pottery featuring coarse inclusions and sometimes black polish emerged.
- 6th–9th centuries AD: Towns became less prominent in favor of agriculture for subsistence. Significant admixture with Slavic and Baltic populations occurred towards the end of this period.

According to Igor Dubov, the Meryans were successors of the Dyakovo culture.

== Settlements ==
The Dyakovo culture is distinguished from preceding cultures by settlements on high riverbanks. Settlements were often fortified with ditches and embankments, as well as fortified dwellings surrounding the settlements. Fortifications were primarily to protect cattle from predators in the initial periods, and to defend against attacks in later periods. Agriculture and hunting were both important parts of the economy.

Houses were typically round huts with deep floors both in earlier and later periods. Other forms of housing included longhouses and right-angled houses.

== Artefacts ==
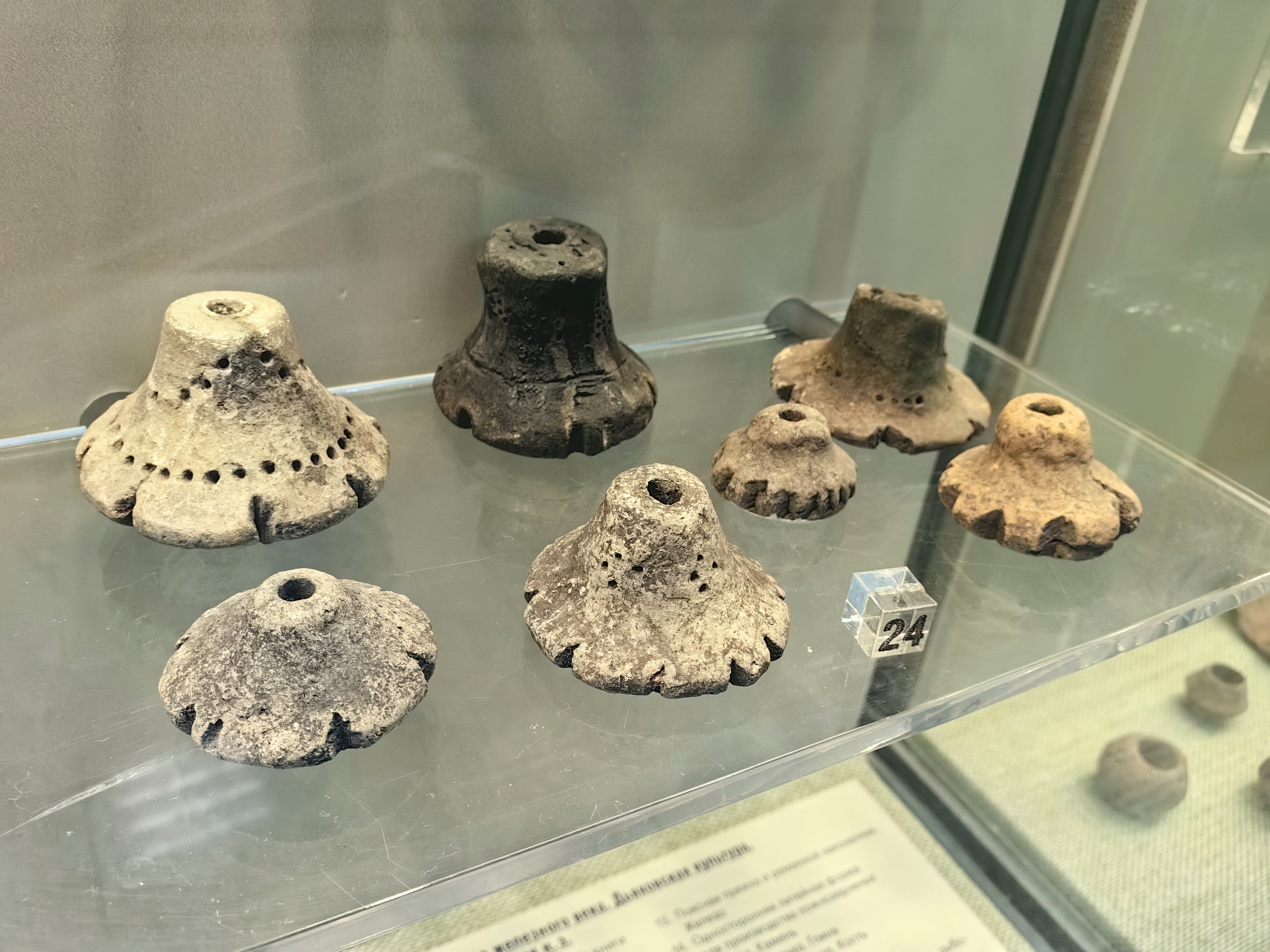
Dyakovo-type weights in the Museum of Archaeology of Moscow

Surviving early Dyakovo tools, arrowheads and harpoons, were made of bone. Metalwork appears in the archaeological record around the 4th–3rd centuries BC, and some of the metal tools were imported from the Middle Don region. Distinct Dyakovo plummets appeared around the same period. Distinctive bronze ornaments and ceramic figurines have been connected to religious practice and potential tribal identity in the later centuries.

=== Ceramics ===
Dyakovo ceramics were initially characterized by a chequered pattern, made with comb and textile imprinting. Pottery became plainer over time, with undecorated ceramics predominating by the early 1st millennium.
