= Kuyaba =

Ancient settlement of the Rus

Coordinates: 50°27′N 30°31′E

Kuyaba (Arabic: كويابة Kūyāba) was one of the three centers of the Rus or Saqaliba (early East Slavs) described in a lost book by Abu Zayd al-Balkhi (dating from ca. 920) and mentioned in works by some of his followers (Ibn Hawqal, Al-Istakhri, Hudud ul-'alam). The two other centers were Slawiya (Arabic: صلاوية Ṣ(a)lāwiya) (tentatively identified with the land of Ilmen Slavs, see Rus' Khaganate) and Arthaniya (Arabic: ارثانية ’Arṯāniya) (not properly explained).

Soviet historians such as Boris Grekov and Boris Rybakov hypothesized that "Kuyaba" was a mispronunciation of "Kiev". They theorized that Kuyaba had been a union of Slavic tribes in the middle course of the Dnieper River centered on Kiev (now in Ukraine).

== See also ==
- Kyi, the legendary founder of Kiev
- Kuyavia, Kuyavian-Pomeranian Voivodeship
- Rus' Khaganate
- Bibliography of Russian history
