= Slawiya =

Tribal center of early East Slavs

Slawiya, as-Slawiya (Arabic: صلاوية Ṣ(a)lāwiya) was one of the three parts of the Rus' with the center in Holmgard (identified with the land of Ilmen Slavs) described in a lost book by Abu Zayd al-Balkhi (dating from c. 920) and mentioned in works by some of his followers (Ibn Hawqal, Al-Istakhri, Hudud ul-'alam). The two other centers were Arthaniya (Arabic: ارثانية ’Arṯāniya) (not properly explained) & Kuyaba (Arabic: كويابة Kūyāba; usually identified with Kiev).

Slawiya is described as the most remote groups of the Rus', together with Kuyaba and Arthania they are involved in extensive international trade relations, in particular with the Muslim East. In Ibn Hawqal describing it is called primary in relation to the other two groups.

Modern historiography tends to identify as-Slawiya with the Novgorodian lands.

== See also ==
- Garðaríki ("the realm of towns")
- Rus' Khaganate
- Novgorod Republic
- Kievan Rus'
- Old Novgorod dialect
