= Arthania =

Reportedly a polity of ancient Rus (from Arabic sources)

Arthania (Arabic: ارثانية ’Arṯāniya; Russian: Арcания, romanized: Arsaniya or Артания (Artaniya); Ukrainian: Артанія, romanized: Artaniya; Belarusian: Артанія, romanized: Artania) was one of the three states of the Rus or Saqaliba (early East Slavs) with its capital in Artha (Russian: Арса, romanized: Arsa). The Persian geographer Abu Zayd al-Balkhi described Arthania in his book (now lost) dating from c. 920 CE and mentioned in works by some of his followers: (Ibn Hawqal, Al-Istakhri, and Hudud ul-'alam). The two other Rus centers identified in the Arabic-language sources were Slawiya (Arabic: صلاوية Ṣ(a)lāwiya, tentatively identified with the land of the Ilmen Slavs, see Rus Khaganate) and Kuyaba (Arabic: كويابة Kūyāba; usually identified with Kyiv).

Ibn Hawqal claims that nobody had ever visited Artha because the locals killed every foreigner attempting to penetrate their land. They are involved in trade with Kuyaba, selling sable furs, lead, and a modicum of slaves.

Modern scholars have been unable to pinpoint the location of Arthania. A linguistic line of argument leads some historians to such far-away places as Cape Arkona on the Baltic Sea, the land of the Erzya (an ethnic group of the Mordva nation; see Gelons and Mordvins) and the Plisnesk hillfort in the Upper Western Bug. George Vernadsky located Arsa on the Taman Peninsula (see Tmutarakan), while Vladimir Minorsky connected "Arsa" with Ryazan. No archaeological confirmation of these linguistic speculations has ever been produced.

Modern Russian historiography tends to identify Arthania with the land of the Merya serving the Volga trade route. Archaeological evidence points to Sarskoe Gorodishche and Timerevo as this area's main centers. The native name of either town remains unknown.

== See also ==
- Bibliography of Russian history
