= Black Grave =

Largest burial mound in Chernihiv, Ukraine

- Чорна могила (Ukrainian)
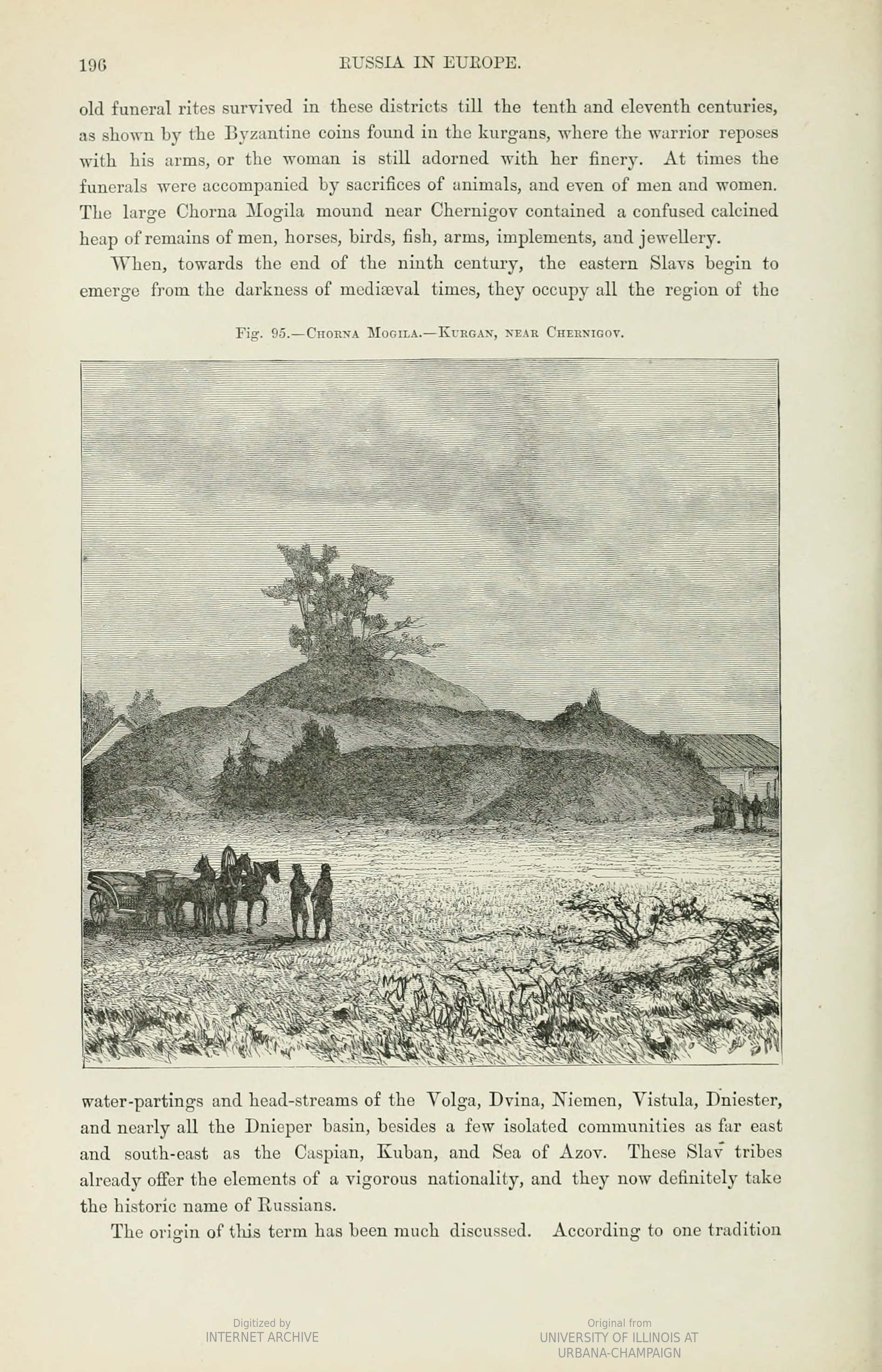
- Engraved by Charles Laplante after Achille-Louis-Joseph Sirouy, 1880
- Interactive map of Black Grave
- 51°29′14.88″N 31°17′38.28″E
- Type: Burial
- Periods: Kievan Rus; Late Medieval Ages
- Location: 4 Kniazia Chornoho Street, Chernihiv, Chernihiv Oblast, Ukraine

History
- Built: 10th century

Site notes
- Height: over 10 metres (33 ft)
- Area: 2,300 square metres (25,000 sq ft)
- Volume: 7,666 cubic metres (10,027 cu yd)
- Circumference: 170 metres (560 ft)
- Excavation dates: 1873
- Management: Chernihiv Ancient

Designations
- Designation: Monument of Archeology

Immovable Monument of National Significance of Ukraine
- Official name: Курган "Чорна Могила" (Black Grave kurgan)
- Type: Archaeology
- Reference no.: 250004-Н
- Burial of prince Chorny

The Black Grave (Ukrainian: Чорна могила, romanized: Chorna mohyla) is the largest burial mound (kurgan) in Chernihiv, Ukraine. It is part of the National Sanctuary of Ancient Chernihiv and is an Archaeological Monument of national importance.

== Overview ==
Comparable to the barrows of Gnyozdovo near Smolensk, the Black Grave has a height of over 10 metres and a circumference of 170 metres. During excavations undertaken in 1872–73, Dmitry Samokvasov uncovered two cremated bodies of Norse warriors (probably father and son), surrounded by slaves, sacrificial animals, arms, armour, and decorations. Samokvasov dated the burial to the late 10th century, when Vladimir I was the ruler of Kievan Rus. It is likely that the buried warriors were two princes (knyazes) of Chernihiv, although no local potentate is attested in the Slavonic chronicles before Vladimir's son, Mstislav of Chernihiv.

After the bodies were cremated, they were put upon a 7-metre-high mound, where a funeral feast took place. Arranged near the bodies were two helmets and knee-length chain mail (hauberks), probably extracted from the pyre, as well as a cauldron with ram bones, two sacerdotal knives, two golden Byzantine coins, an imported sabre, a miniature dark-red bronze idol of Thor, and two silver-bound aurochs horns decorated with floral motifs, fabulous animals, and figures of a man and a woman shooting at a bird. When the barrow was completed, a stele was placed at the top. All these items are now displayed at the State Historical Museum in Moscow.

At the present time the site of the burial mound along with other 34 buildings (mostly churches) are included in the Chernihiv National Architecture-Historical Reserve "Ancient Chernihiv". The Black Grave along with the rest of the reserve is the major tourist attraction in the Chernihiv Oblast (province) of Ukraine.

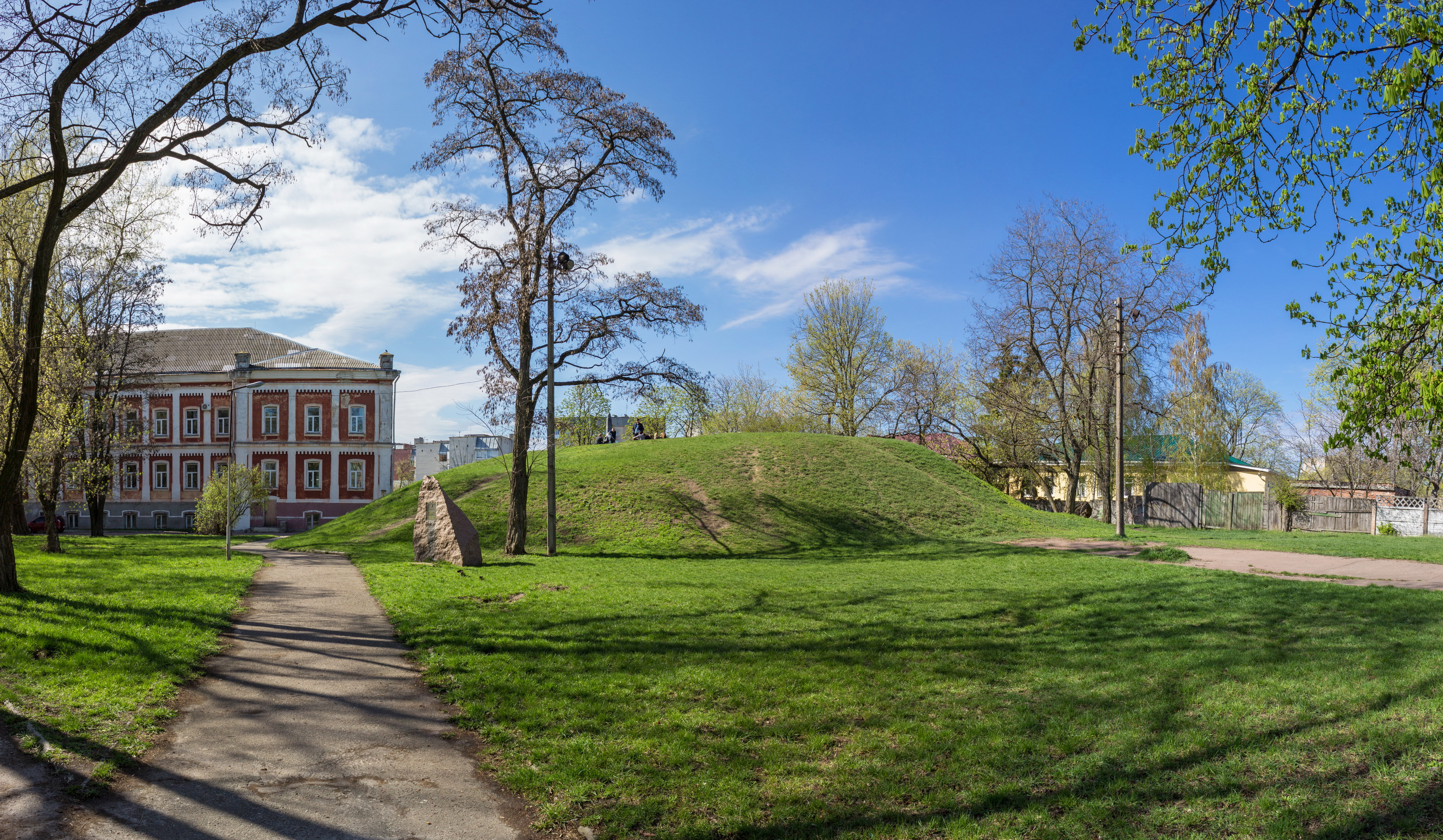

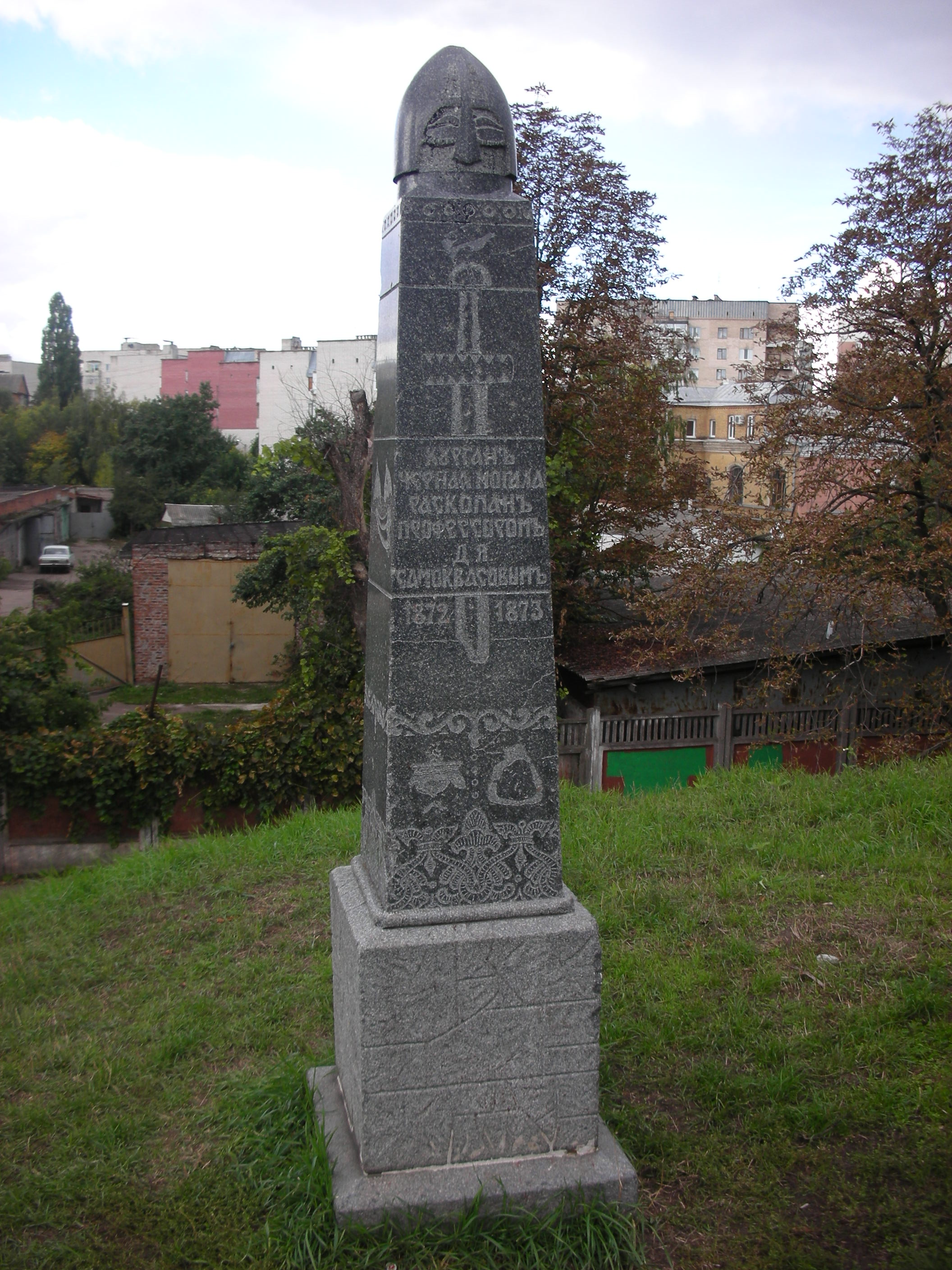

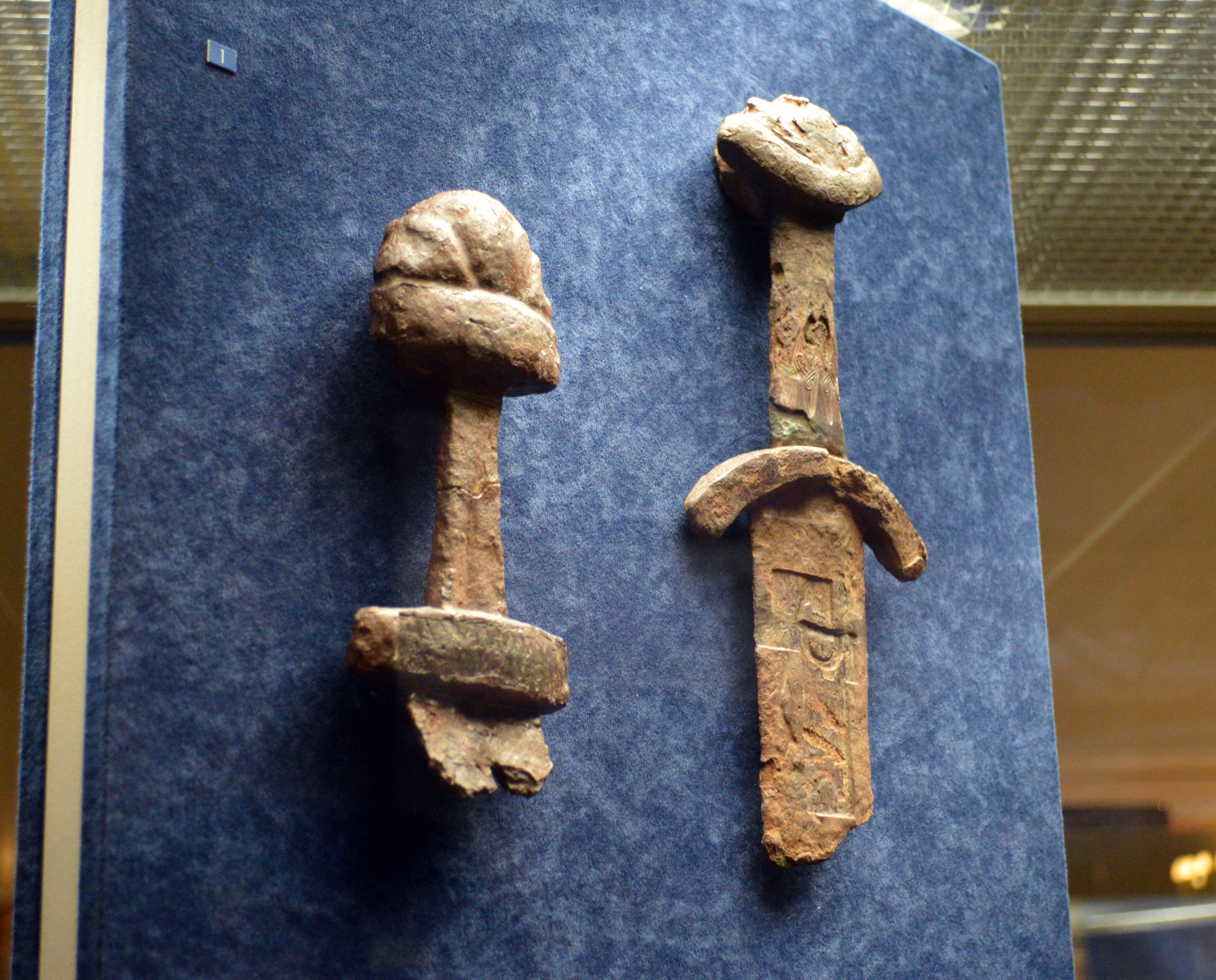

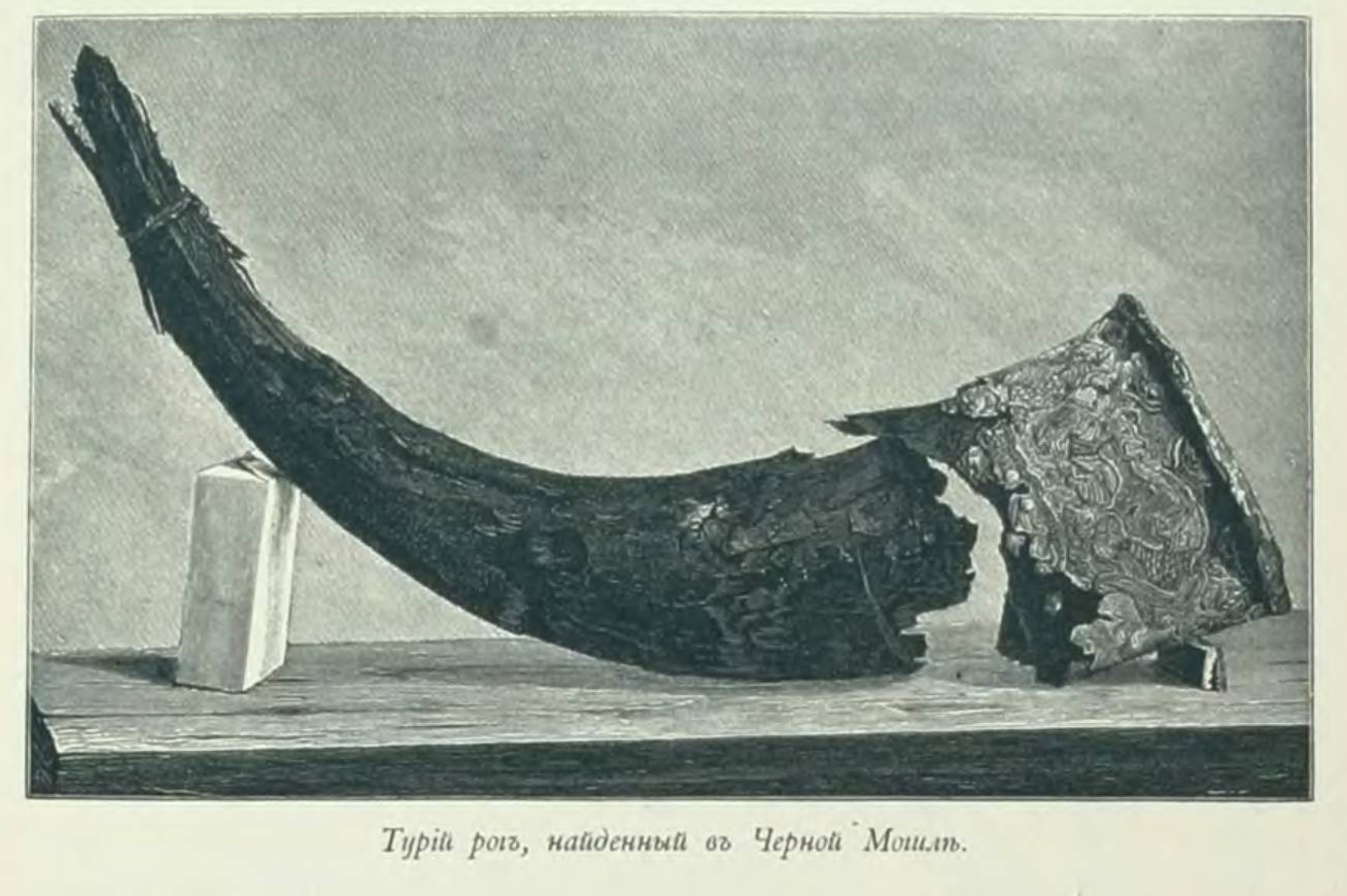

== Bibliography ==
- Dmitry Samokvasov. Могилы русской земли. Moscow, 1908.
- Boris Rybakov. Древности Чернигова. // Материалы и исследования по археологии СССР, №11, Moscow-Leningrad, 1949.
- T.A. Pushkina. Бронзовый идол из Черной могилы. // Вестник Московского университета. Серия 8. История, №3, 1984.
