= Lake Nero =

Body of water in Yaroslavl Oblast, Russia

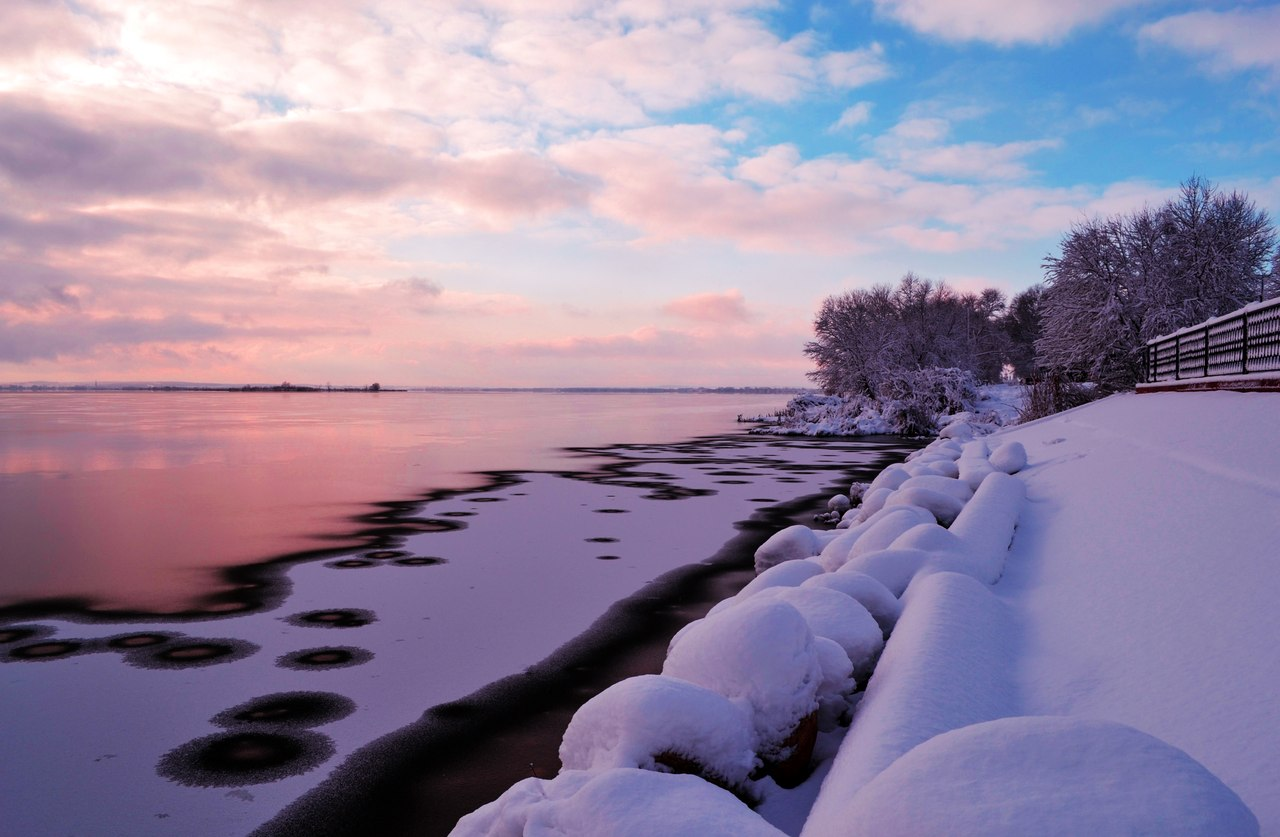
- Lake Nero in winter

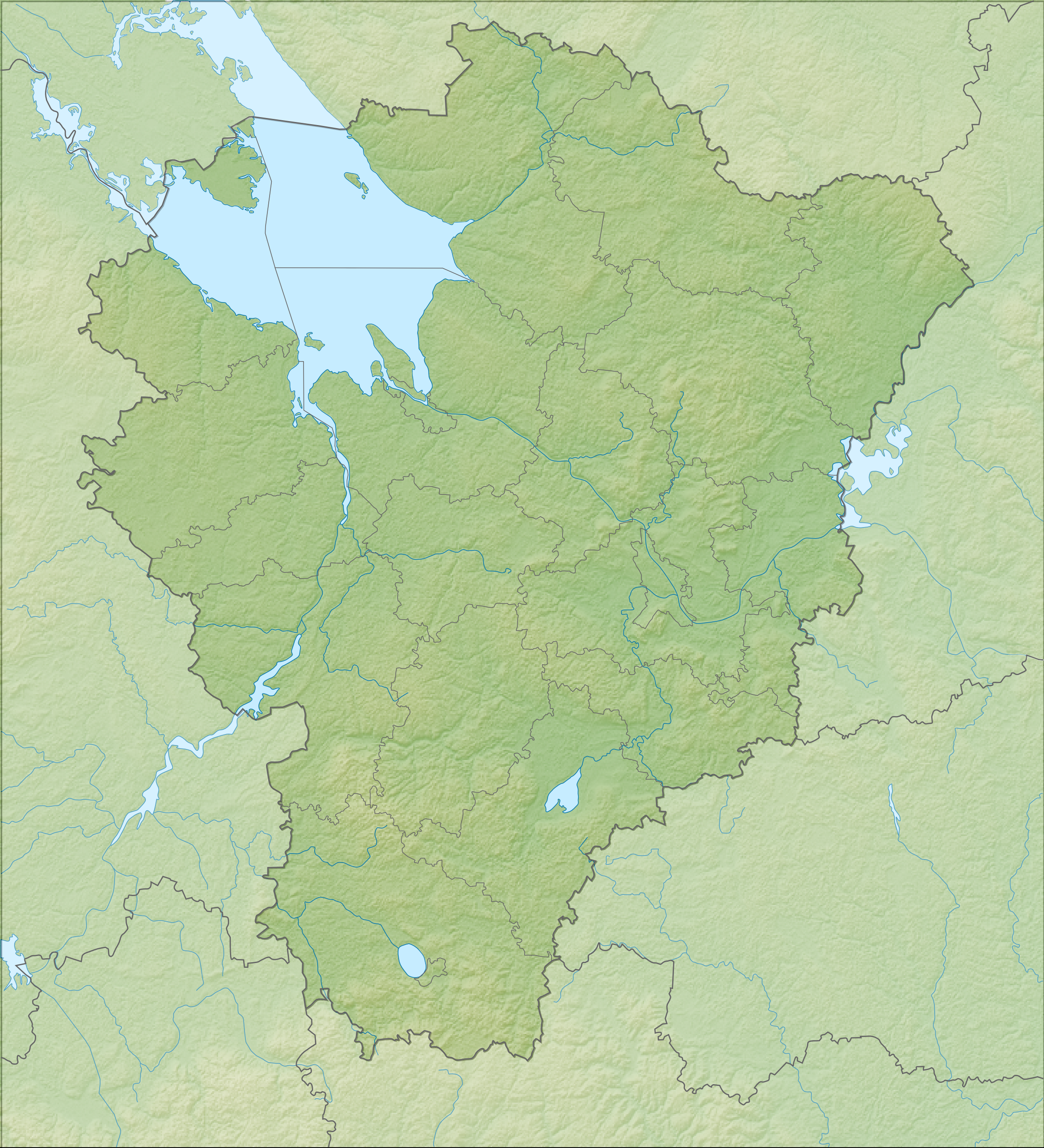
- Location within Yaroslavl Oblast
- Location: Yaroslavl Oblast
- Coordinates: 57°9′53″N 39°26′12″E
- Lake type: eutrophic
- Primary inflows: Sara (Russian: Сара), Ishnya (Russian: Ишня), Kuchibosh (Russian: Кучибош), Mazikha (Russian: Мазиха), Varus (Russian: Варус), Chucherka (Russian: Чучерка), Unitsa (Russian: Уница), Sula (Russian: Сула)
- Primary outflows: Veksa
- Basin countries: Russia
- Max. length: 13 km (8.1 mi)
- Max. width: 8 km (5.0 mi)
- Surface area: 51.7 km^{2} (20.0 sq mi)
- Max. depth: 3.6 m (12 ft)
- Islands: 2 (Levsky, Christmases)
- Settlements: Rostov

Lake Nero (Russian: Не́ро) is a shallow, highly eutrophic lake in Yaroslavl Oblast, Russia. The lake has an area of 54.4 km^{2}, a maximum length of 13 km, width 8 km and depth 3.6 m. The bottom of the lake is covered with thick layer of silt sapropel (a sort of ooze used as fertilizer and for other purposes).

The lake is estimated to be about 500 thousand years old, making it one of a few pre-ice age lakes in central Russia.

The first people settled at the lake 6 thousand years ago. It is historically certain that the Merya people had their capital in Sarskoe Gorodishche on the southern shore of the lake. They named the lake Nero (meaning "silty", "marshland") or Kaovo ("place where gulls live").

In the 9th century East Slavs came to the lake. They called the lake Rostovian Lake in the honor of town Rostov.

There are two significant islands, Lvovsky (Львовский, "Lvy Island"), also known as Lesny (Лесный, "Forest Island"), and Rozhdestvenskij (Рождественский, "Christmas Island"), also known as Gorodskoj (Городской, "Town Island"). The latter formed a pre-ice age monolith. The eight rivers that flow into Nero Lake are Sara (Russian: Сара), Ishnya (Russian: Ишня), Kuchibosh (Russian: Кучибош), Mazikha (Russian: Мазиха), Varus (Russian: Варус), Chucherka (Russian: Чучерка), Unitsa (Russian: Уница), Sula (Russian: Сула), one flows out Veksa (Russian: Векса).

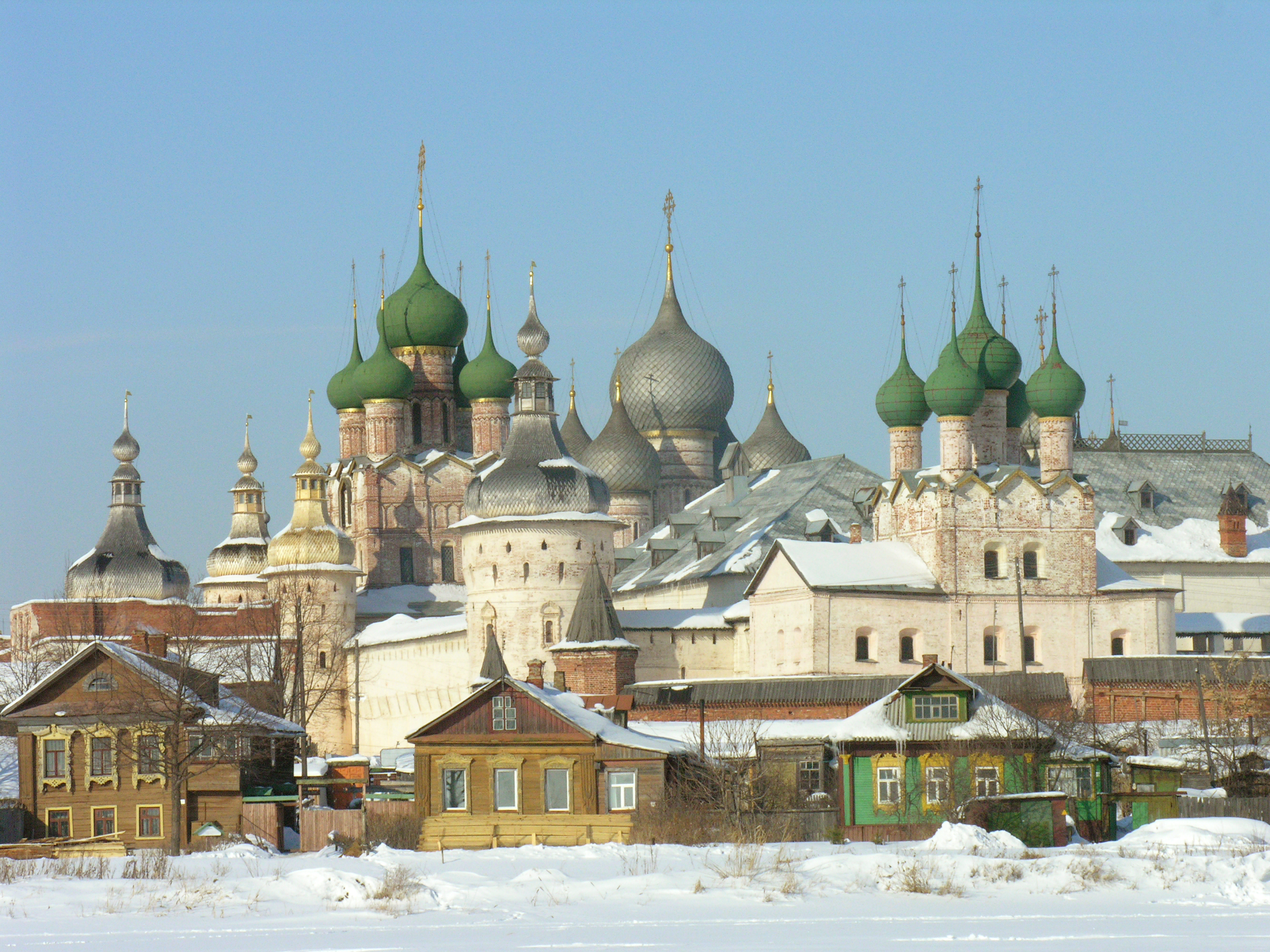
View of Rostov from Nero Lake (photo 2006)

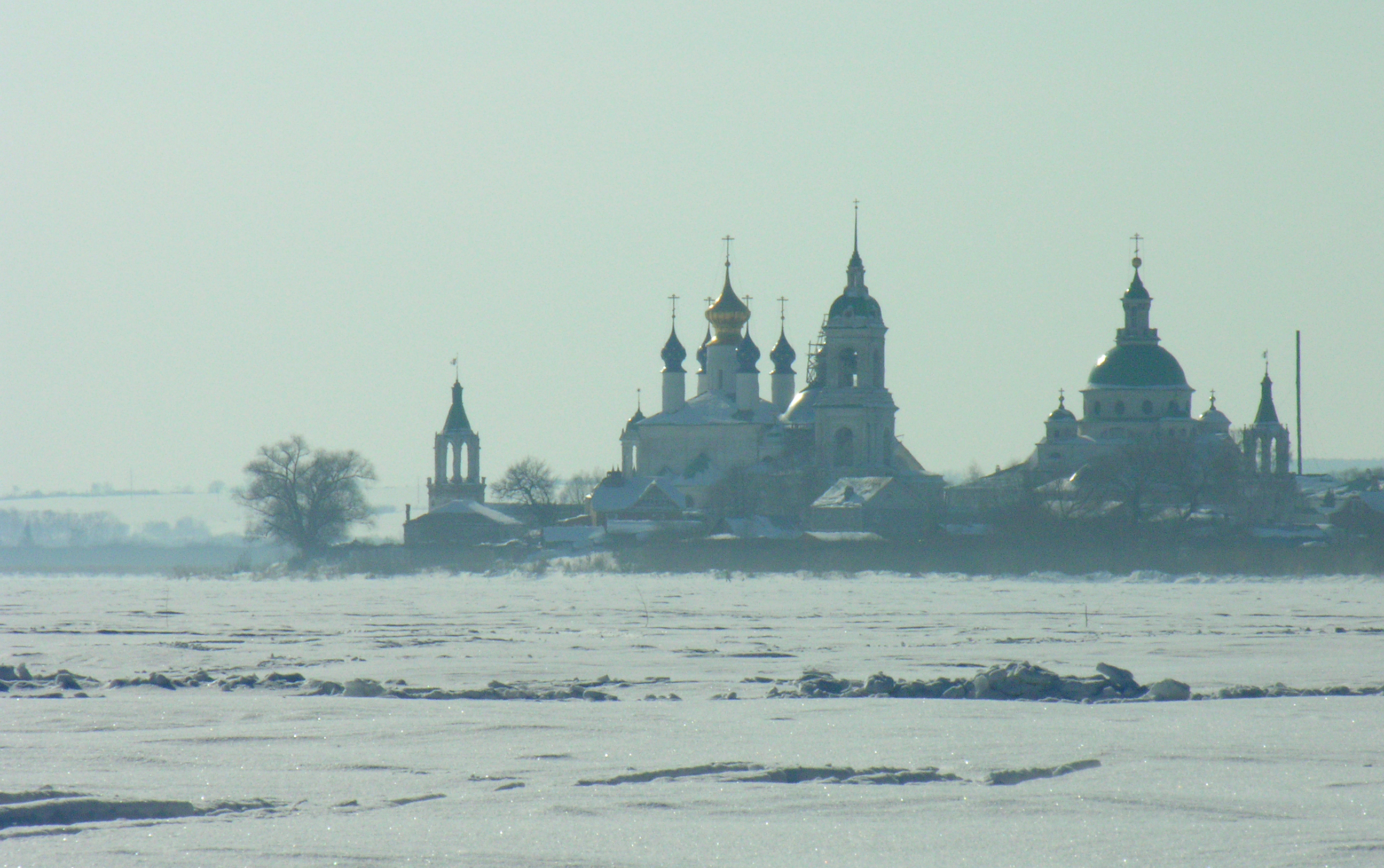
View of Spaso-Yakovlevsky abbey in Rostov from Nero Lake (photo 2006)

Near Nero Lake is located the town of Rostov (on the western shore of the lake) and a few villages (on perimeter): Porech’e-Rybnoe (Russian: Поречье-Рыбное), Ugodichi (Russian: Угодичи), Vorzha (Russian: Воржа), L’vy (Russian: Львы) etc.

The first steamboat Emel’yan (Russian: Емельян) appeared on the Lake in 1883.
