= Dmitry Samokvasov =

Russian archaeologist and legal historian (1843–1911)

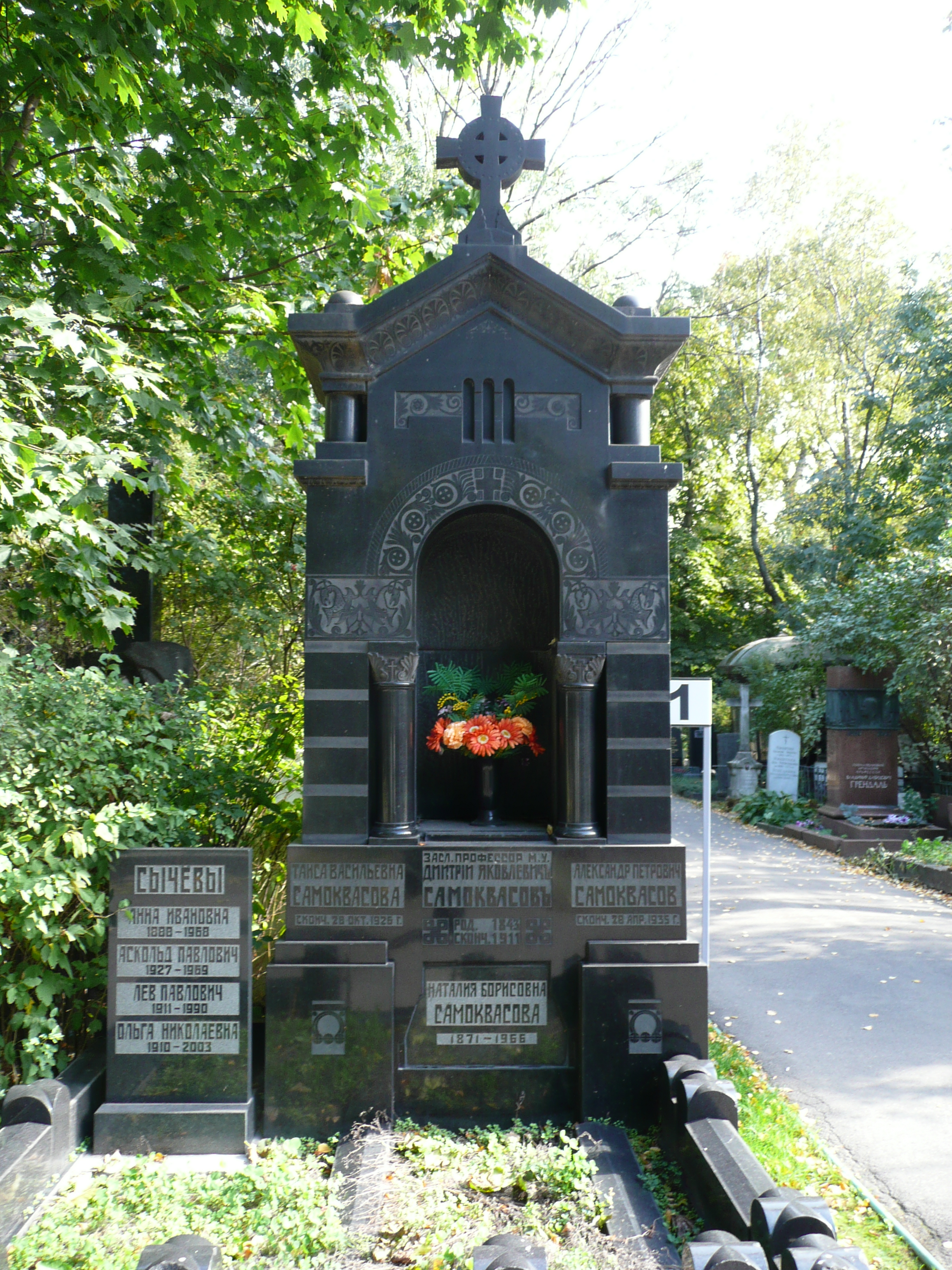
Samokvasov's grave at the Novodevichy Cemetery

Dmitry Yakovlevich Samokvasov (Russian: Дмитрий Яковлевич Самоквасов; 1843 — 1911) was a Russian archaeologist and legal historian who excavated the Black Grave in Chernigov and several other sites important for the history of Kievan Rus. He graduated from the St. Petersburg University in 1868 and worked in the Warsaw University, administering its law faculty and becoming its dean in 1891. Three years later, he moved to the Moscow University. He was instrumental in establishing the Moscow Archaeological Institute (1907). His last years were spent sorting out historical archives in Moscow. In 1891, Samokvasov donated his sizable collection of archaeological artifacts to the State Historical Museum. He was buried at the Novodevichy Cemetery.

== Bibliography ==
- "Самоквасов, Дмитрий Яковлевич" . Brockhaus and Efron Encyclopedic Dictionary (in Russian). 1906.
