= Armand Kohl =

French illustrator

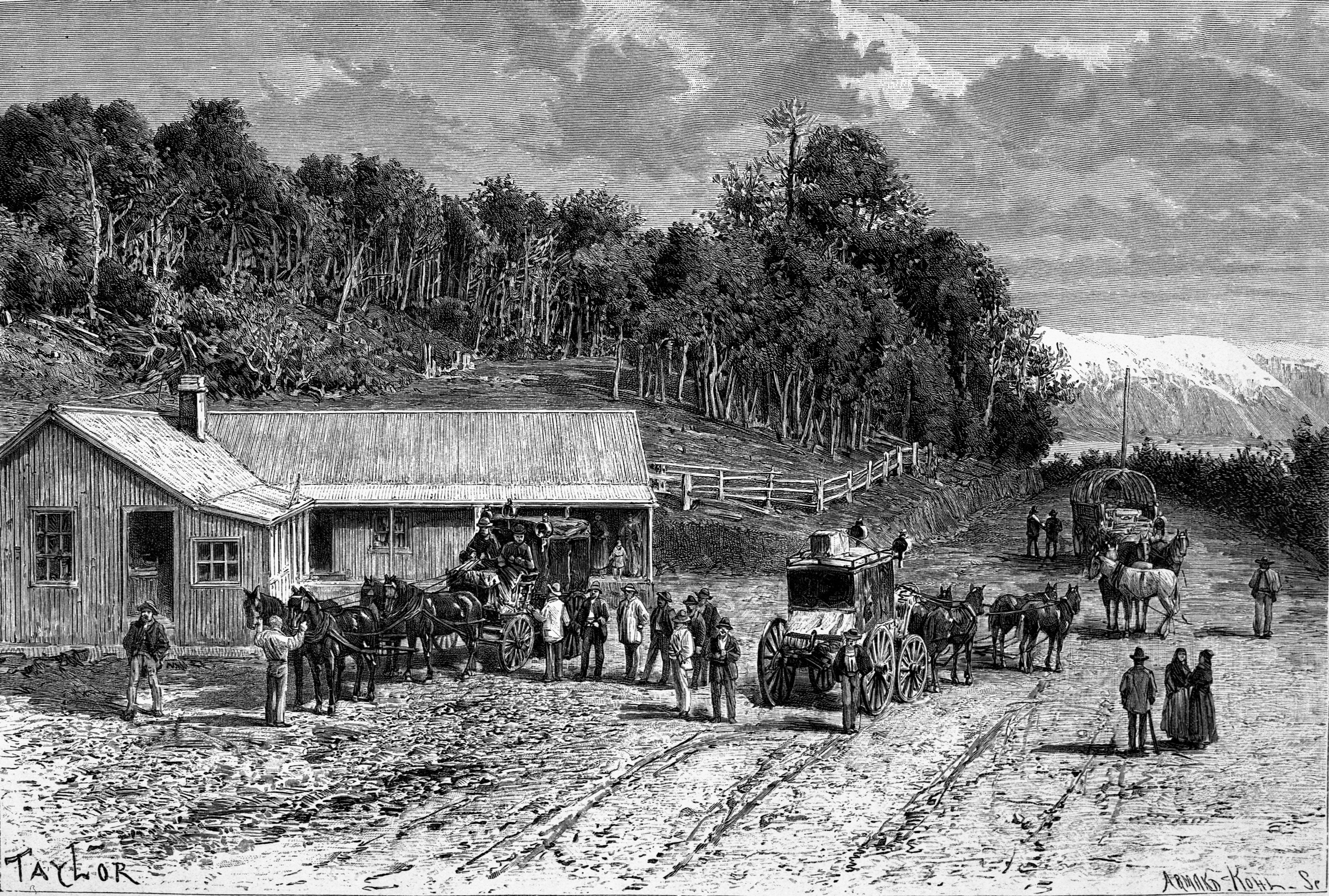
Shows two coaches and a cart stationed outside hotel at Bealey on the West Coast Road, Canterbury. Distant glimpses of the Bealey River and the Southern Alps in New Zealand

Armand-Emile-Jean-Baptiste Kohl, (born 1845 Paris), was a French illustrator and prolific engraver, a student of Alexandre Falguière and Charles Laplante, and who exhibited at the Paris Salon from 1869.

His engravings were after the work of artists such as T. Taylor (fl. 1890), Achille Sirouy, Frédéric Théodore Lix (1830-1897), Wanckler, James MacLaren Barclay and Henri Zuber.

== Biography ==
Born in Paris in 1845, Armand Kohl studied under Alexandre Falguière and Laplaute. He exhibited his works at the Salon (Paris) from 1869 onwards and received an honorable mention in 1888.

== Books illustrated ==
- Voyages dans l´Amerique du Sud, París, 1883
- The Garden magazine, William Robinson
- The English Flower Garden, William Robinson, 1883
- The Garden that I Love, Alfred Austin, (Macmillan and Co. 1894)
- La Nouvelle Géographie universelle, la terre et les hommes, Élisée Reclus, 1875
