= Igor Dubov =

Russian archaeologist

Igor Vasilievich Dubov (Игорь Васильевич Дубов; 1947–2002) was a Russian archaeologist who excavated one of the largest settlements on the Volga trade route, Timerevo.

Dubov was born in Leningrad but spent his young years in Yaroslavl. He studied in the Leningrad University under Mikhail Artamonov and later was a professor there. In 1972 he went to study the kurgans near Yaroslavl. It was Dubov's expedition that found in Timirevo the largest hoard of 9th-century Arabic dirhams in Eastern Europe.

Dubov was also the first to study runic graffiti on dirhams and published a monograph on the subject. In his dissertation he examined the phenomenon of "moving cities" in Gardariki. He was appointed Director of the Russian Ethnographic Museum in 1987.
