= Gnyozdovo =

Village in Smolensky District, Smolensk Oblast, Russia

Coordinates: 54°47′10″N 31°50′20″E

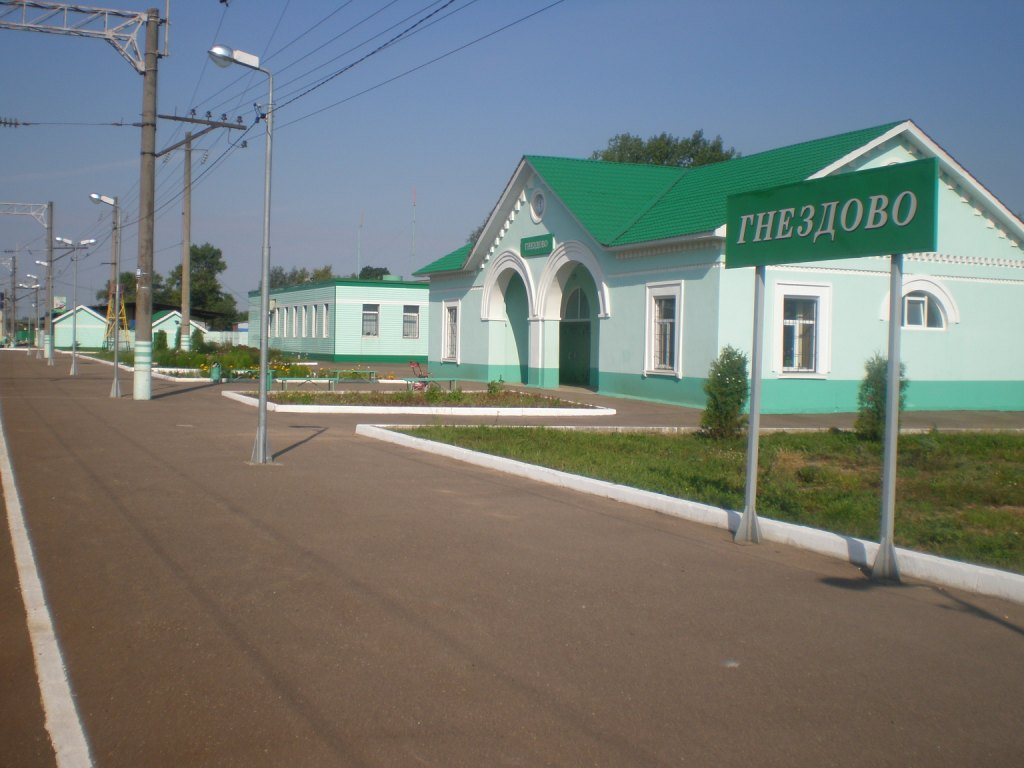
Gnyozdovo railway station

Gnyozdovo (Russian: Гнёздово) is a village in Smolensky District, Smolensk Oblast, Russia, located on the right bank of the Dnieper River twelve kilometers downstream from Smolensk, in the proximity of Katyn. The village is noted for its extensive remains of a Slavic-Varangian settlement which flourished in the 10th century as a major trade station on the trade route from the Varangians to the Greeks, see Gnezdovo for details.
