= Sarskoye Gorodishche =

Medieval fortified settlement in Yaroslavl Oblast, Russia

Coordinates: 57°4.463′N 39°17.334′E

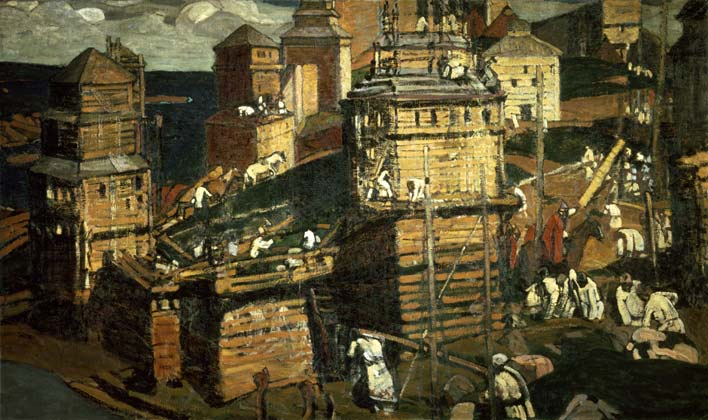
One of the excavators of Sarskoye was Nicholas Roerich. Illustrated is his painting The Town Is Being Built (1902).

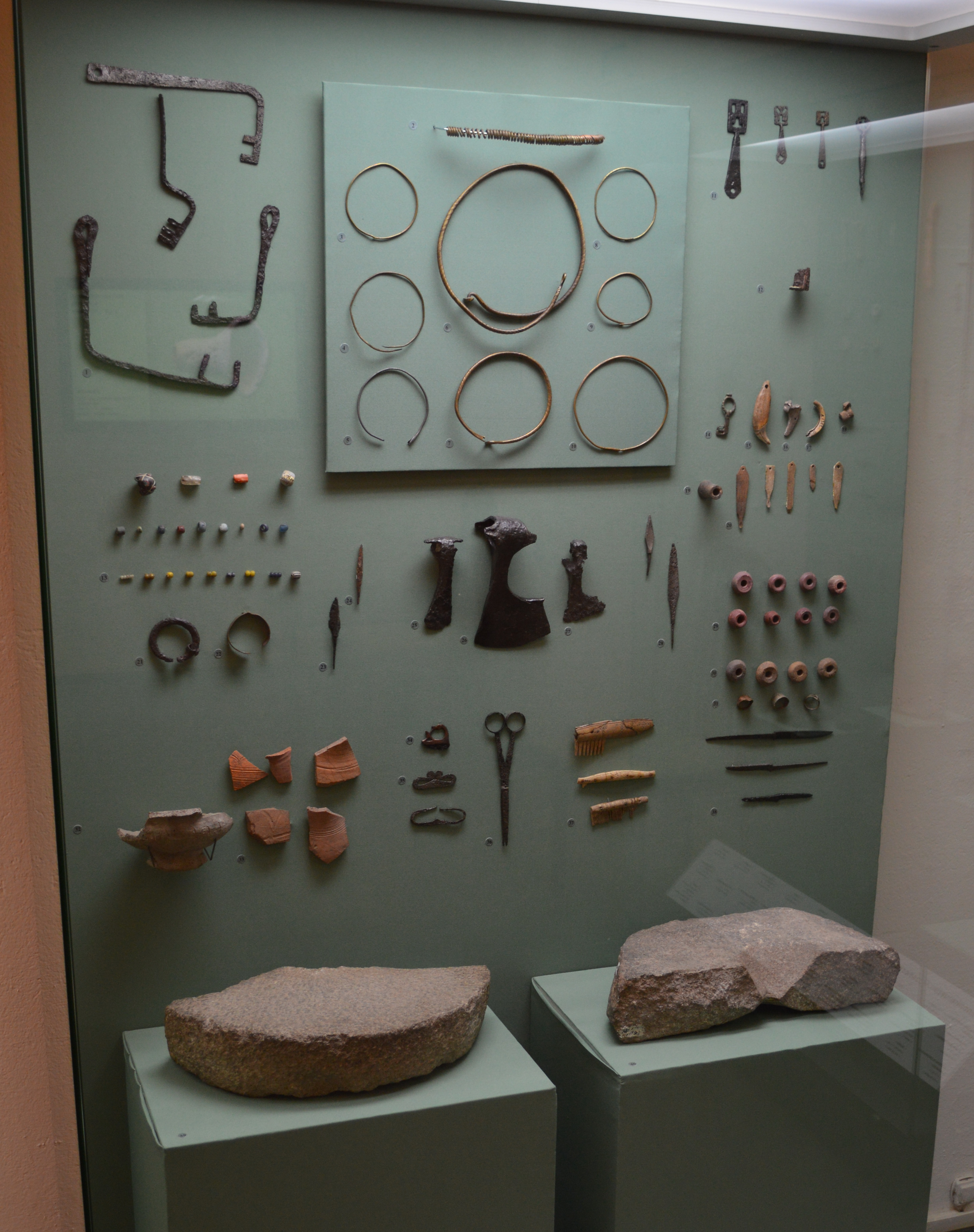
Sarskoye artefacts

Sarskoye Gorodishche or Sarsky fort (Russian: Сарское городище, literally "Citadel on the Sara") was a medieval fortified settlement in present-day Yaroslavl Oblast, Russia. It was situated on the bank of the Sara River, a short distance from Lake Nero, to the south of modern Rostov, of which it seems to have been the early medieval predecessor.

== Exploration ==
The site first attracted the attention of Russian archaeologists in the mid-19th century due to its imposing dimensions, which have no parallels in the region. Excavations begun by Count Aleksey Uvarov in 1854 revealed a number of superb Varangian objects comparable to the sites in Scandinavia, notably a Carolingian sword with the inscription "Lun fecit". Excavations have been undertaken intermittently since that period by many persons, including Nicholas Roerich in 1903. In his diary, Roerich complained that the site had been reduced drastically by road builders.

After Soviet archaeologists resumed excavations, they rejected the traditional attribution of the site to the Norsemen, proclaiming it the largest centre (perhaps the capital) of the Merya, a Finnic tribe which inhabited the region prior to the arrival of the Slavs. According to the Great Soviet Encyclopaedia, the Merya township goes back to the 6th century, but its fortifications were constructed by the Slavs in the 10th century. The settlement suffered a decline in the late 10th century but seems to have endured until the 13th century, when it is first mentioned in a major chronicle as "Sarskoe Gorodishche".

== Interpretation ==
Major Varangian finds at Sarskoye date from ca. 800 onward, indicating that it was a major (perhaps the most important) trade station on the Volga trade route between Scandinavia and Baghdad. Traces of a bath, an iron foundry, a potter's workshop and a jeweller's shop were encountered. There were two hoards of early 9th-century dirhams. Another deposit was detected in the vicinity: it contained dirhams inscribed with Runic signs, interpreted as a thanksgiving to Thor.

Side by side with this evidence of a Scandinavian presence, the native Merya element is strong. For instance, there are numerous beaver symbols made of clay: the beaver was a sacred animal for the Finns. Although cremations were encountered, inhumation is predominant. Like the Slavs and Varangians at Gnezdovo, the Merya and the Norsemen seem to have peacefully co-existed in the 9th and 10th centuries. The settlement appears to have escaped the violent clashes of the Norsemen with the indigenous population, so characteristic of the Ladoga region.

== Sarskoe vs Rostov ==
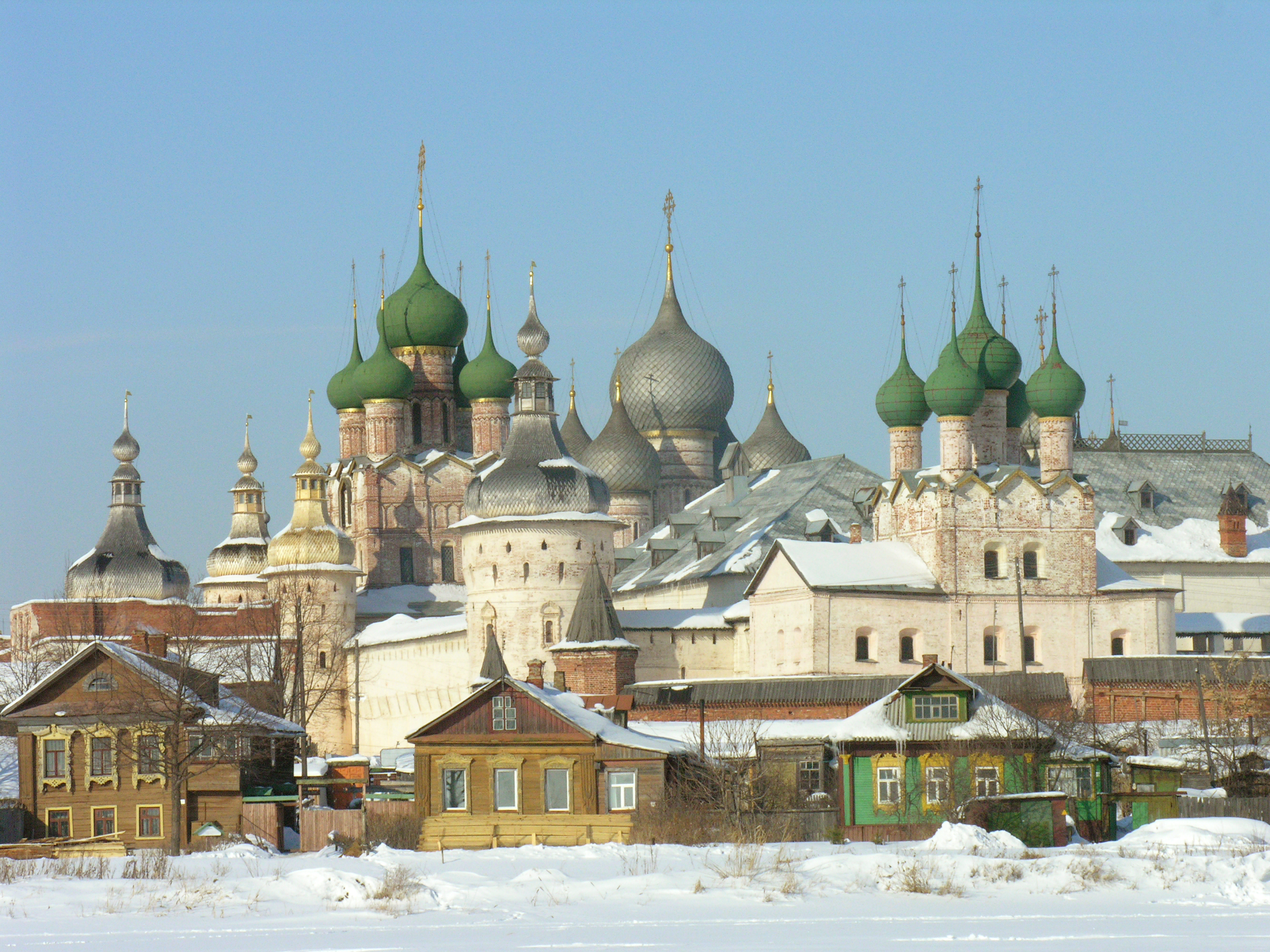
Rostov as seen from Lake Nero

The earliest pavement of Rostov is dated by dendrochronology to 963. These pieces of wood were uncovered in post-1949 digs, throwing much light on the earliest years of the city. At about the same period, the decline of Sarskoe Gorodishche started. Whether the town was simply transferred to a new place remains debatable. It is also not clear if the original Slavic name of Sarskoe Gorodishche was Rostov or something different. The original name of the settlement might have been Arsa (the capital of mysterious Arsania, according to Ibn Hawqal).

Historians have experienced difficulty in explaining why the superior location of Sarskoe was abandoned in favor of a boggy site where Rostov now stands. According to one theory, the town was transferred primarily for religious considerations, so as to have the water frontage facing a rocky island with a major sanctuary of Veles. Whatever the reasons for the decline of Sarskoe, the similar sites at Timeryovo near Yaroslavl and Gnezdovo near Smolensk relinquished their administrative and economic primacy roughly in the same period.
