= Timerevo =

Archaeological site in Russia

Coordinates: 57°35′35″N 39°43′24″E

Timerevo (Russian: Тимерёво, Timeryovo) is an archaeological site near the village of Bolshoe Timeryovo, seven kilometers southwest of Yaroslavl, Russia, which yielded the largest deposits of early medieval Arabic coins in Northern Europe.

== Description and history ==
Inscription upon a chess piece unearthed at Timerevo.

The site covers an area of five hectares and has no fortifications. It seems to have been operated by the Varangians from their principal base at Sarskoe Gorodishche, near Rostov. Like Sarskoe, it is situated at a distance from a major waterway — the Volga River. Nevertheless, substantial amounts of Arabic coins indicate its position as the most important Scandinavian trade outpost in the proximity of the Volga trade route.

The site was first settled by a mixture of Norse merchants and local population in the ninth century. This dating is based on three major hoards of dirhams that were detected at Timeryovo since the 1960s. The first hoard, numbering about 2,100 coins, was dispersed before scholars learnt about its existence. Only seventeen coins are known from this deposit, the earliest datable to 867. Another hoard also numbering more than 2,000 dirhams (entire and in pieces), was the largest deposit of such coins ever found from Early Medieval Europe. The earliest coin was issued by Idris II (who reigned in the 810s and 820s). Many dirhams have Runic graffiti carved on them.

The site was abandoned towards the end of the ninth century, only to be revived half a century later. At least 400 druzhina kurgans were erected there in that period. The burial rite normally featured cremation. Excavations revealed an unusual amount of Scandinavian pottery and a surprising number of crosses, indicating that a large portion of the Norse population was Christianised. Among other finds were amber artifacts from the Baltic, a unique roaster, a spatha labelled by a certain Ulfberht from the Rhine, and a chess piece with an enigmatic Runic inscription (illustrated, to the right).

The site was definitively abandoned in the early eleventh century, simultaneously with the decline of Sarskoe Gorodishche and the foundation of Yaroslavl. The latest coin found at Timerevo was issued by Bruno II of Friesland (dating it between 1038 and 1057).

Archaeologists have uncovered skeletal remains from inhumation burials (intact bodies buried directly in the ground). These skeletons include local populations (Finno-Ugric and Slavic) and Norse/Scandinavian settlers

== Similar sites ==
A growing number of other early medieval sites have been excavated near Yaroslavl, each important in its own way. The site of Mikhailovskoe immediately north of the city was explored from the nineteenth century to 1961. Of 400 barrows excavated there, only four percent yielded Scandinavian finds. Most burials featured inhumations of ordinary Slavs and Merians. The site of Medvezhy Ugol (literally, "Bear's Nook") in downtown Yaroslavl, proved to be a humble, primarily Merian settlement. More recently, twenty six burial mounds were found at Petrovskoe to the south of the city; these are still largely unexcavated. All these sites date to the mid-tenth century.

Although "objects of Scandinavian origin constitute a miserly per cent of the total of all finds, and nothing firmly indicating a complete Norman complex has yet been found", scholars suggest that within fundamentally Slavic settlement of the area "was a Norman colony, which constituted a staging point midway on the route from the Vikings to the East." Archaeologist Igor Dubov, who excavated the settlement in the 1970s, views it as a center (perhaps the capital) of mysterious Arsania mentioned by Ibn Hawqal.
