= Achille-Louis-Joseph Sirouy =

French painter

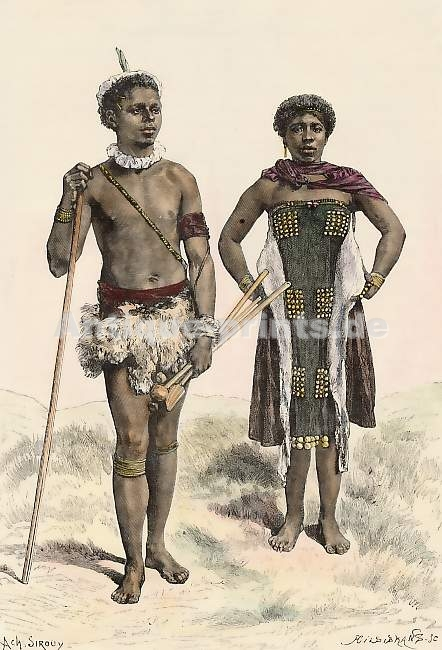
Homme et Femme Cafres (1888)

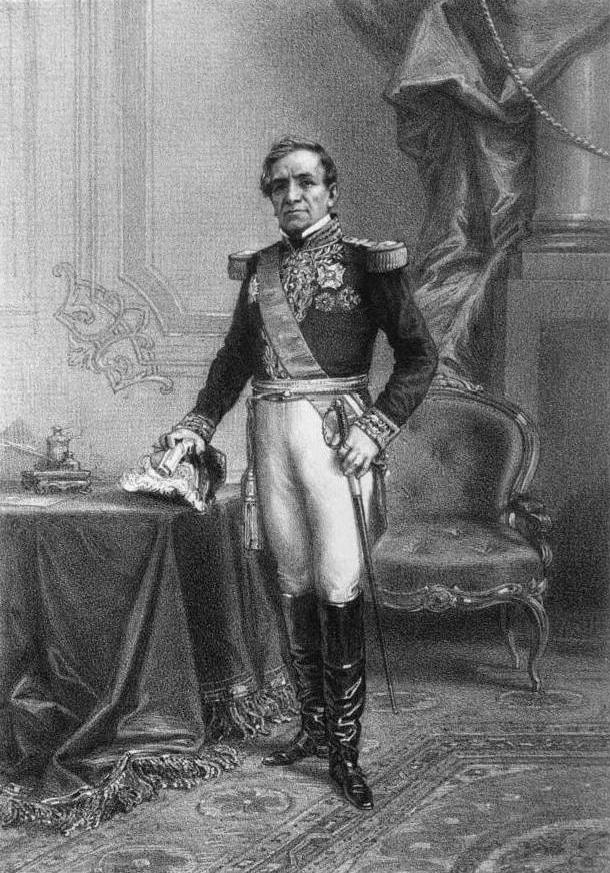
Le Maréchal Andrés de Santa Cruz (1861)

Achille-Louis-Joseph Sirouy (29 November 1834 Beauvais - January 1904 Paris) was a French engraver, lithographer, painter and illustrator. He worked in Aurillac, Beauvais and Paris between 1849 and 1904. A pupil of Émile Lassalle and Thomas Couture, Sirouy produced numerous lithographs after Delacroix, Alexandre-Gabriel Decamps, Meissonier, Tassaert and Ludwig Knaus, and large numbers of portraits of celebrities, statesmen and politicians. He depicted many mythological and biblical scenes, such as The Punishment of Tantalus (1866), The Mirror (1868), The Prodigal Son (1873) and The Sphinx (1880). He was awarded the Grand Cross of the Legion of Honour in 1869 for his lithographic work.

Sirouy illustrated Mark Twain's The Adventures of Tom Sawyer and The Adventures of Huck Finn.

He was given a number of commissions by the State, including the décor of the Palais de la Légion d'Honneur formerly known as l'Hôtel de Salm, when its interior was devastated by a fire in 1871.

== Bibliography ==
- Thieme-Becker, Bd. 31, 1937, S. 103
