= Ciudad de Vascos =

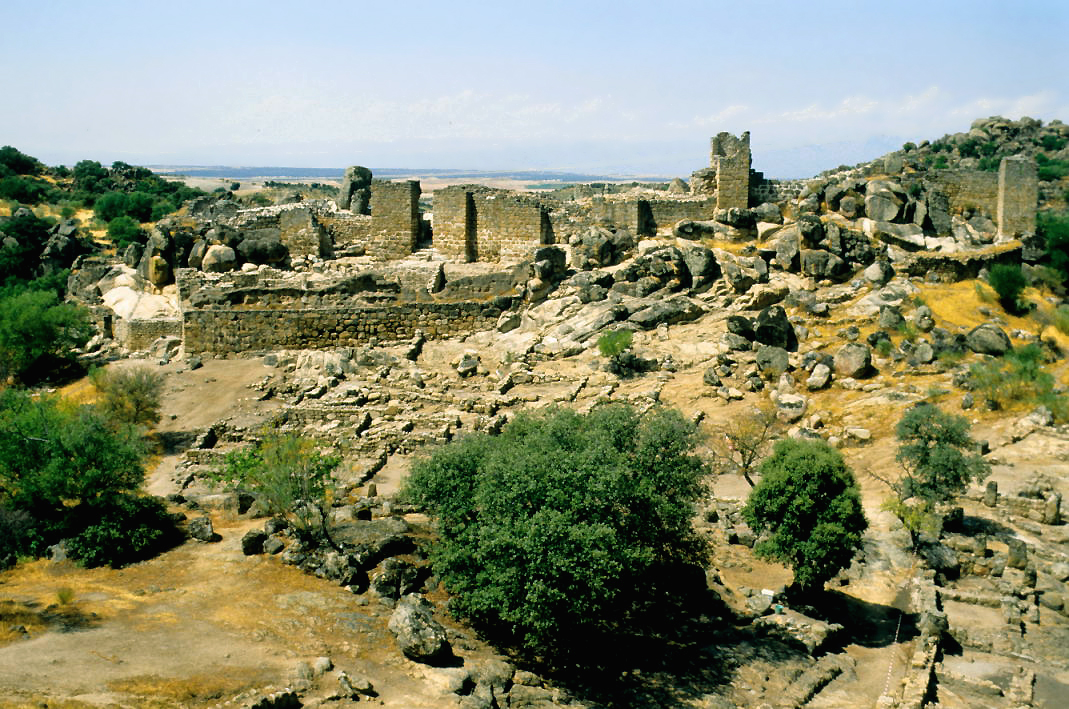
- Interactive map of Ciudad de Vascos
- 39.756°N 5.087°W
- Location: Navalmoralejo, Castilla-La Mancha, Spain

Spanish Cultural Heritage
- Type: Non-movable
- Criteria: Archaeological site
- Reference no.: RI-55-0000051

Ciudad de Vascos is a medieval archaeological site in the Spanish municipality of Navalmoralejo in which the Andalusī city (medina) of Vascos once stood.

The site lies on an escarpment of the river Huso. Vascos seems to have been founded under Umayyad initiative, perhaps dating to circa 930–950. Due to its location in an area of large Berber settlement, it may have been built by the Cordobese central power to gather and control unruly Nafza tribe members, in addition to its strategic role close to the Tagus to prevent Christian incursions. There are also signs of metallurgical activity. Attached to the Middle March of Al-Andalus, the housing of the small walled city included a kasbah, two mosques, and two cemeteries located outside the walls.

Following the fitna of al-Andalus, Vascos ended up in the western limit of the Taifa of Toledo, whose Dhulnunid rulers were generally at odds with the Taifa of Badajoz. In that period, the city seems to have experienced a substantial increase of its military garrison as well as general population growth. After the Christian conquest of Toledo in 1085, the place depopulated by the late 11th century.

The site was declared 'national historic-artistic monument' (precursor to the status of Bien de Interés Cultural) in June 1931.

== Bibliography ==
- Izquierdo Benito, Ricardo (2021). "Vascos: un enigmático enclave de al-Andalus" (PDF). Actualidad de la investigación arqueológica en España III (2020-2021): conferencias impartidas en el Museo Arqueológico Nacional [Vascos: an enigmatic enclave of al-Andalus]. pp. 259–276. ISBN 9788481817720.
- Izquierdo Benito, Ricardo (2005). "Una ciudad de la Marca Media: Vascos (Toledo)" (PDF). Arqueología y Territorio Medieval. 12 (2): 35–56. ISSN 1134-3184.
