= Ibn al-Wafid =

Andalusian Arab physician and pharmacologist

Ibn al-Wāfid ابن الوافد
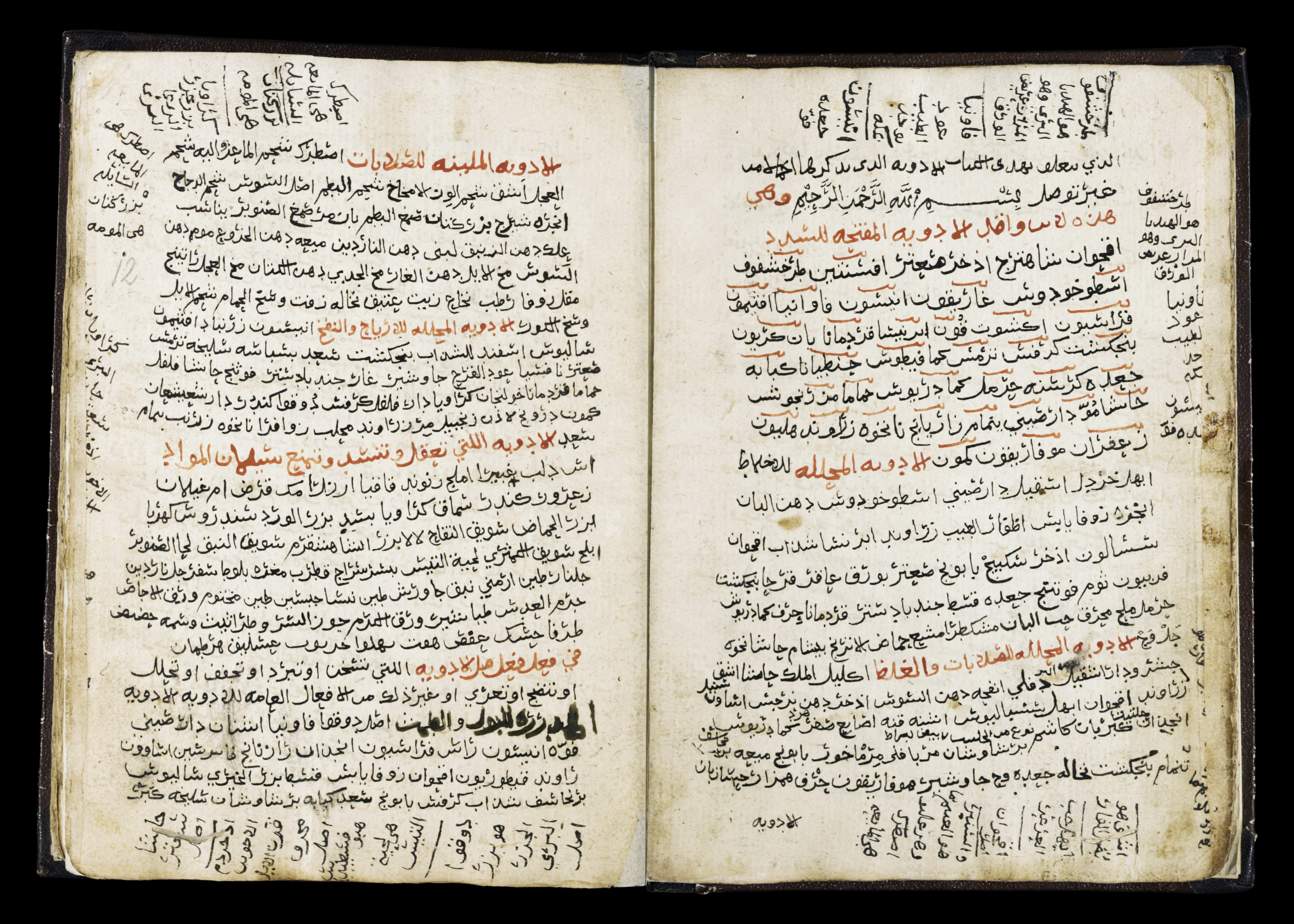
- Kitāb al-Adwiya al-Mufrada excerpt from a collective 17th-18th-century manuscript
- Born: December 997 or 1008; Taifa of Toledo, Andalusia
- Died: 1074 (aged 65-66) or after 1077
- Occupations: Pharmacologist, Physician, Vizir of Al-Mamun of Toledo
- Writing career
- Notable works: Kitāb al-adwiya al-mufrada كتاب الأدوية المفردة

ʿAlī ibn al-Ḥusayn ibn al-Wāfid al-Lakhmī (Arabic: علي بن الحسين بن الوافد اللخمي; c. 1008 – 1074), known in Latin Europe as Abenguefith, was an Andalusian Arab pharmacologist and physician from Toledo. He was the vizier of Al-Mamun of Toledo. His main work is Kitāb al-Adwiya al-Mufrada (كتاب الأدوية المفردة), translated into Latin as De Medicamentis Simplicibus.

Ibn al-Wafid was mainly a pharmacist in Toledo, and he used the techniques and methods available in alchemy to extract at least 520 different kinds of medicines from various plants and herbs.

One of his students was Ibn al-Lūnquh.

== Works ==
- Kitab al-Adwiyah al-Mufrada (On Simple Drugs)
- Kitab al-Wisād fī l-ṭibb (The Pillow Book on Medicine)
- Mujarrabāt fī l-ṭibb (Experiences in Medicine)
- Tadqīq al-naẓar fī ʿilal ḥāssat al-baṣar (Fine Examination of the Diseases Affecting the Sense of Sight)
- Kitab al-Mughīth (The Book of the Helper)

== See also ==
- Serapion the Younger
