= Pseudo-Hisham =

Khalaf
- Pretender
- Died: c. 1044; Seville
- Regnal name claimed: Hisham II
- Title(s): Caliph of Córdoba
- Throne(s) claimed: Al-Andalus; Caliphate
- Pretend from: 1035
- Royal House: Claimed Umayyad dynasty

Khalaf (died c. 1044), known as Pseudo-Hisham in historiography, was a pretender to the Caliphate of Córdoba. In 1035, he rose to prominence in Calatrava la Vieja by claiming to be the disappeared Caliph Hisham II and convincing the local people to rebel against their overlord Ismail al-Zahir of the Taifa of Toledo. Though the revolt did not last long, it garnered the attention of another warlord, Abu al-Qasim of Seville, who took Khalaf under his protection and officially recognized him as Hisham II. With Abu al-Qasim's support, Khalaf's caliphate was widely recognized across al-Andalus (Islamic Spain), even though he was quickly denounced as a fraud by officials from Cordoba as well as scholars. Khalaf acted as a figurehead for the regimes of Abu al-Qasim and his son Abbad II al-Mu'tadid, with his "reign" lasting until his death in 1044. However, his death was not announced by al-Mu'tadid until 1060.

== Biography ==
=== Early life and proclamation in Calatrava ===
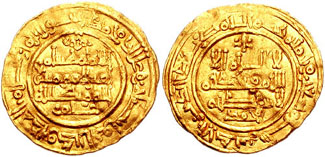
Gold dinar of Hisham II, dated (AH 396) 1006/7 AD

Though sources differ on his place of origin, (Note: Orientalist Reinhart Dozy stated that Khalaf was foreign to Calatrava, whereas researcher Eduardo Manuel Gil Martínez described him as a native of the town.) Khalaf was originally an esterero, a worker who specialized in making mats and other utensils from esparto grass. At some point, he became aware that he shared a physical similarity to Caliph Hisham II. The latter disappeared in 1013 amid the chaotic Fitna of al-Andalus, likely murdered when a claimant to the caliphate, Sulayman ibn al-Hakam, captured Cordoba. As Hisham II's death was never confirmed to the public, however, various myths and rumors began to emerge in relation to the former caliph. Legends circulated about his alleged survival in exile in the east or him hiding until the right moment emerged to retake power. The Fitna of al-Andalus ultimately led to the fracturing of the Caliphate of Cordoba into various infighting taifa realms, and people gradually began to nostalgically regard Hisham II's reign as the "golden days" of the shattered Islamic realm.

In 1035, Khalaf decided to exploit his likeness to Hisham II by claiming to be the disappeared caliph, convincing the people of Calatrava to acknowledge him. He was so successful that the town renounced its loyalty to Ismail al-Zahir, ruler of the Taifa of Toledo, and appointed Kalaf as the new sovereign. The Toldedan warlord was not inclined to accept this development and promptly sent troops to crush this rebellion. The town was besieged by Ismail's troops, causing the locals to expel Khalaf and return to the allegiance to Toledo. At this point, another strongman intervened: Abu al-Qasim, ruler of the Taifa of Seville, saved Khalaf from Calatrava and smuggled him into Seville. Abu al-Qasim viewed the pretender as a great opportunity to increase his own status and legitimacy.

=== "Reign" in Seville ===
From Seville, Abu al-Qasim spread word to all of al-Andalus that Hisham II was still alive and had reappeared. To explain Khalaf's previous life as an esterero in regard to his alleged royal origin, Abu al-Qasim crafted a tale which incorporated elements of already-existing legends about the disappeared caliph. The Sevillian ruler claimed that Hisham II had escaped from Cordoba in 1013 and secretly fled to Asia where he had embarked on a Hajj to Mecca, only to be robbed by soldiers of the local emir. He was left nearly destitute, but managed to travel to Jerusalem where he befriended a silversmith and learned the latter's trade to make a living. After a few years of being a silversmith's assistant, Hisham II allegedly returned to the Iberian Peninsula under the "false name" of Khalaf, temporarily working as an esterero until revealing his "true" identity to Calatrava's people. To further bolster this tale's credibility and present himself as a dutiful man, Abu al-Qasim officially stepped down as the ruler of Seville to assume the position of hajib (de facto prime minister) to Hisham II, although he kept all power. The Sevillian strongman also paid several people to declare under oath that Khalaf was Hisham II, including a few women who had previously been part of Hisham II's harem.

Map of the taifas in 1037. With his seat in Seville, Pseudo-Hisham was recognized in several of the taifa realms across al-Andalus.

This story about Hisham II's reappearance initially enjoyed substantial support among the common people, and he was also recognized by several taifas outside of Seville, including Carmona, Denia, Tortosa, Majorca, and Valencia. In the realms which recognized him, coins were minted in Pseudo-Hisham's name and prayers were held for him in the mosques. Abu al-Qasim hoped to use the pretender to seize Cordoba for himself, allegedly to move Pseudo-Hisham back into his old palace. As a result of the local enthusiasm for a Umayyad restoration, the Taifa of Córdoba initially also recognized the pretender. Yet Cordoba's government also sent a delegation requesting a meeting with the caliph to confirm his identity. Even though Abu al-Qasim agreed to the meeting, it was held in a darkened room, with the Sevillian strongman claiming that the caliph's alleged eye problems required minimal light. This only increased the delegation's doubts and Cordoba subsequently rescinded its recognition of Pseudo-Hisham. Similarly, contemporary scholars such as Ibn Hayyan and Ibn Hazm firmly rejected Pseudo-Hisham as an impostor.

Based on the Cordoban reaction, other taifas also rejected Pseudo-Hisham and Abu al-Qasim proved unable to exploit the imposter to truly unify Islamic Spain under his banner. Some taifas also rejected Pseudo-Hisham due to his association with Sevillian power. Regardless, Pseudo-Hisham remained enthroned in Seville and continued to enjoy recognition in large parts of al-Andalus. On "special occasions", Pseudo-Hisham would be decked out in ceremonial robes and paraded in Seville to bolster Abu al-Qasim's authority.

In 1042, Abu al-Qasim died and passed control of Seville to his son Abbad II al-Mu'tadid. Pseudo-Hisham officially appointed al-Mu'tadid as his new hajib, "maintaining the fiction" which had begun under Abu al-Qasim. As years went on, however, it became increasingly difficult for al-Mu'tadid to keep pretending that the caliphate still functioned as the alleged caliph grew so old as to stretch credulity. In 1060, at which point the real Hisham II would have been 100 years old, al-Mu'tadid finally announced to the public that the caliph (i.e. Khalaf) had died in 1044 without a successor. Despite this, some taifa kingdoms continued to mint coins in the name of Hisham II or Pseudo-Hisham until 1083.

== Historiography ==
Historians generally agree that Pseudo-Hisham was an imposter. Researcher Eduardo Manuel Gil Martínez described the reign of Pseudo-Hisham as a "great farce" which Abu al-Qasim skillfully exploited to his advantage. Historian Brian A. Catlos described Pseudo-Hisham as an "ideological springboard" for the Sevillan rulers, as the Abbadid dynasty lacked caliphal authority and thus had to find various other means to obtain legitimacy.
