= Siege of Toledo (1085) =

Leónese siege of the capital of Taifa of Toledo

- Part of Reconquista
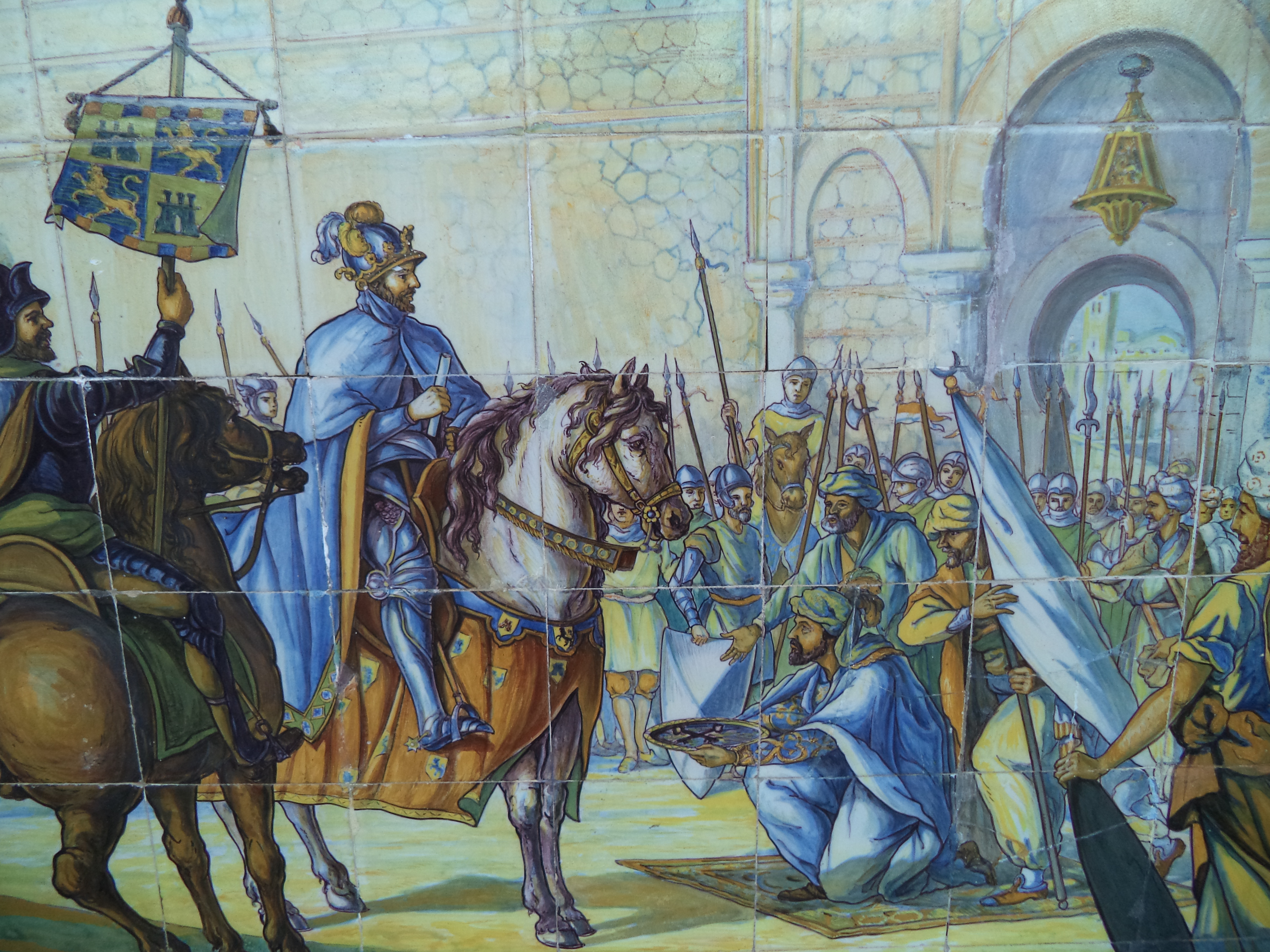
- The Siege of Toledo as depicted in azulejos at the Plaza de España, Seville, built for the Ibero-American Exposition of 1929
Date	1084 - 6 May 1085
Location	Toledo
Result	Leónese victory
Territorial changes	Toledo annexed to the Kingdom of León

Belligerents
Taifa of Toledo	Kingdom of León; Kingdom of Castile

Commanders and leaders
Yahya al-Qadir	Alfonso VI of León and Castile

The siege of Toledo (Arabic: سقوط طليطلة, romanized: Suqūṭ Ṭulayṭilah, lit. 'Fall of Ṭulayṭilah') was the Leónese siege and eventual conquest of Toledo, the capital of the Taifa of Toledo, by Alfonso VI of León and Castile in Muharram 478 / May 1085. The city, under the hajib (ruler) Yahya al-Qadir of the Dhulnunid dynasty, fell after a prolonged campaign.

The Leónese conquest of Toledo marked a significant turning point in the Reconquista and a major shift in power on the Iberian Peninsula. The city was captured through a strategy of attrition warfare, a method the Kingdom of Castile had refined over the preceding years. As one of the most significant events of the taifa era, the siege underscored Castile's growing dominance in the region.

== Context ==
In 1075, through an alliance with the Taifa of Seville, Alfonso VI defeated the Taifa of Granada. Later that same year, Alfonso VI provided support to Toledo against the Taifa of Córdoba.

After the assassination of hajib al-Mamun in the city of Córdoba, Yahya al-Qadir assumed power in Toledo. However, Yahya al-Qadir's actions, including the expulsion of Alfonso's supporters, deepened divisions among his subjects and destabilized his rule.

== Siege ==
In the autumn of 1084, Alfonso VI established a permanent camp south of Toledo. The purpose of this encampment was to maintain constant pressure on the city until he could return with a substantial army the following year. Alfonso himself had returned to León by December.

In mid-March 1085, Alfonso brought his main forces back to Toledo. After approximately two months of siege, Yahya al-Qadir surrendered; he had been unable to secure assistance from neighboring taifas, pay off Alfonso, or defend the city effectively.

The terms of surrender, finalized on May 6, 1085, guaranteed the safety of Muslims’ lives, property, liberty, and religious practices. Separate agreements were also negotiated with the Jewish population of Toledo. Alfonso formally entered the city on May 25, 1085. By August, his forces had also conquered the surrounding territories of the Tagus Basin, including Madrid, incorporating them into the Kingdom of León.

== Legacy ==
The fall of Toledo prompted the rulers of the taifas of Seville, Badajoz, and Granada to send a joint delegation to Yusuf ibn Tashfin of the Almoravid dynasty to request assistance against the Leónese.
