= Kingdom of Toledo =

Kingdom of Toledo may refer to:

- Visigothic Kingdom, the capital of which was Toledo from 542 to 711
- Taifa of Toledo, a Muslim state in the 11th century
- Kingdom of Toledo (Crown of Castile)
