= List of Bienes de Interés Cultural in the Province of Cuenca =

This is a list of Bien de Interés Cultural landmarks in the Province of Cuenca (Spain), Spain.

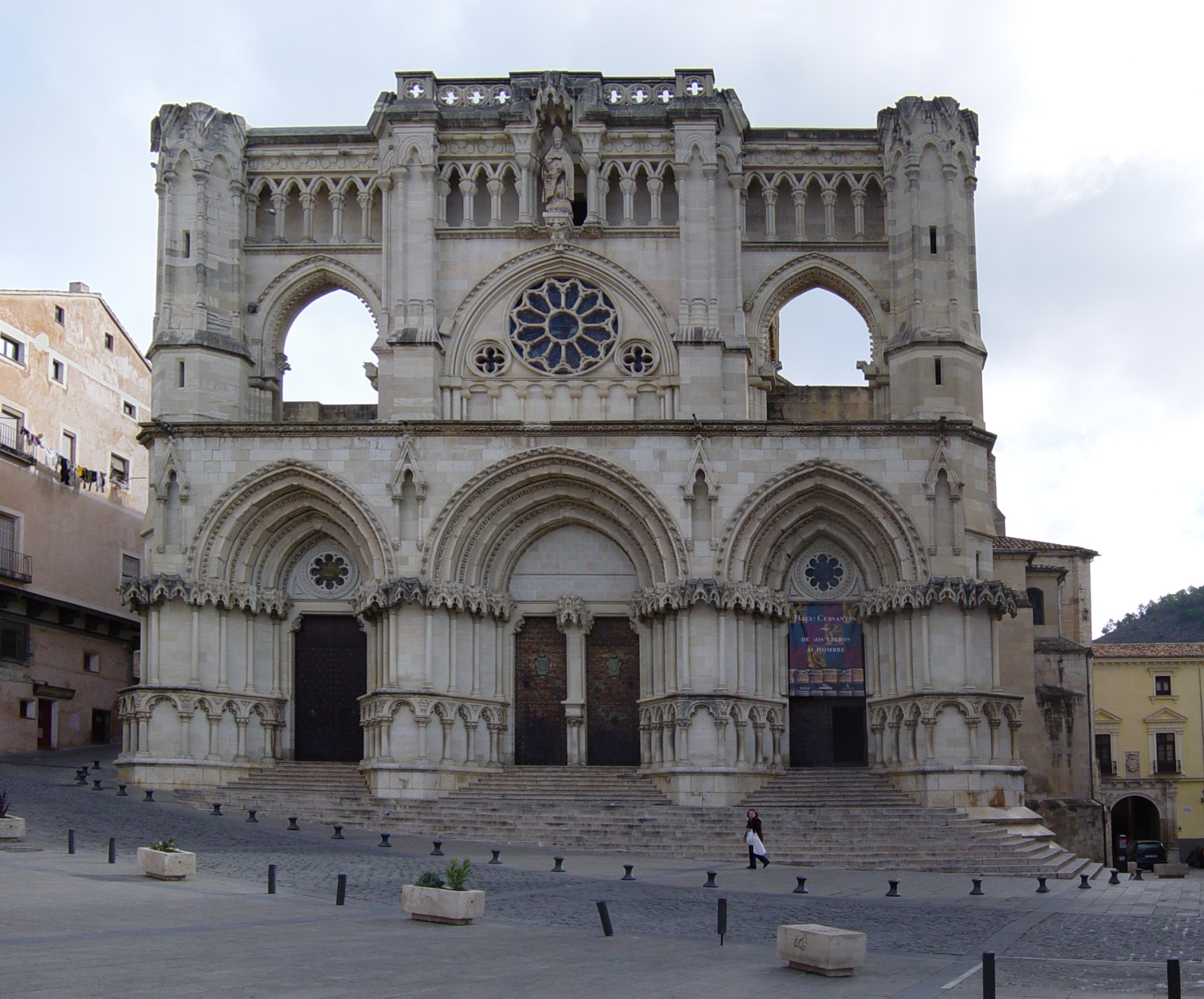
Façade of the Cathedral of Saint Mary and Saint Julian (Cuenca Cathedral).

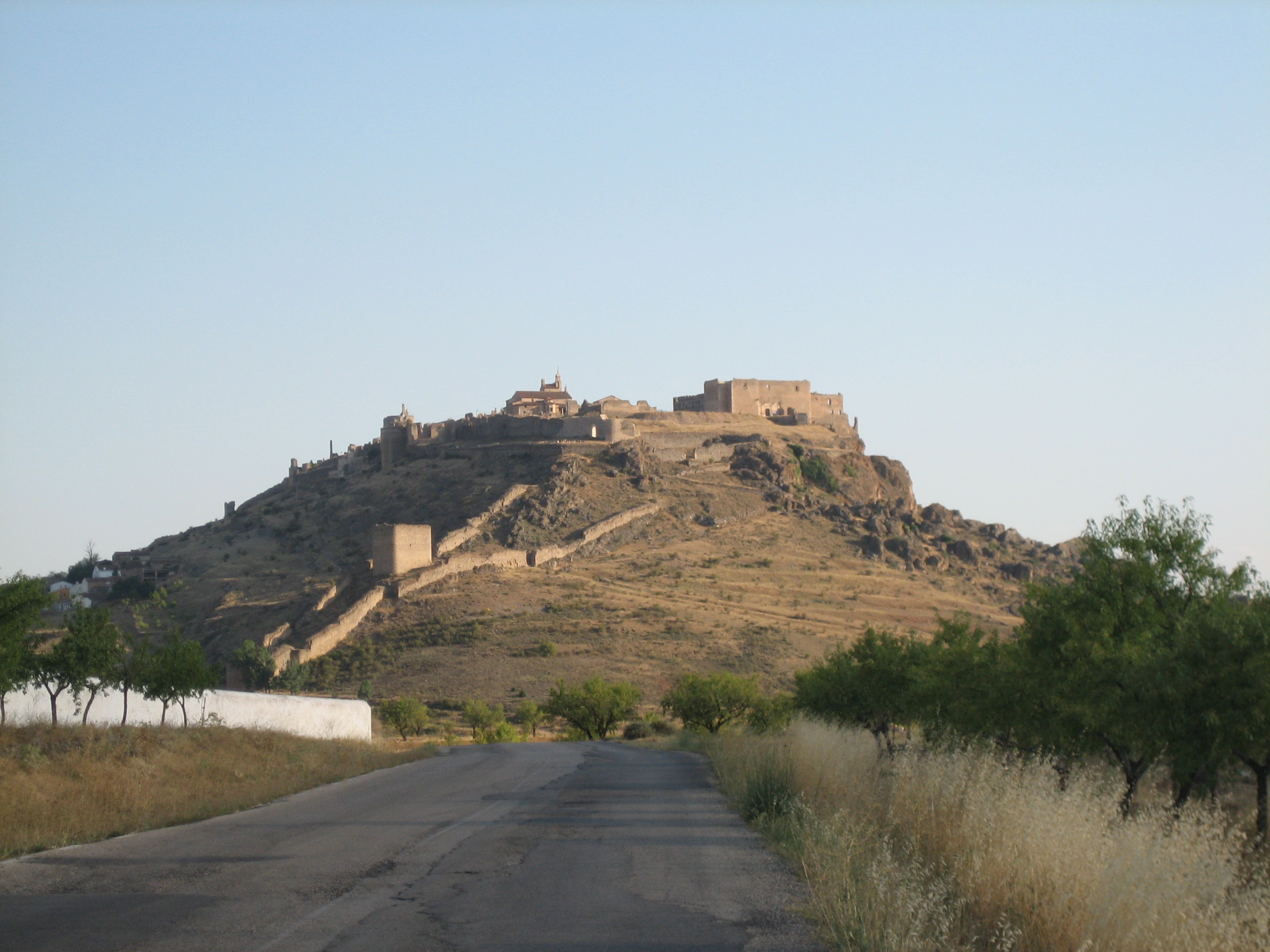
View of the Moya castle

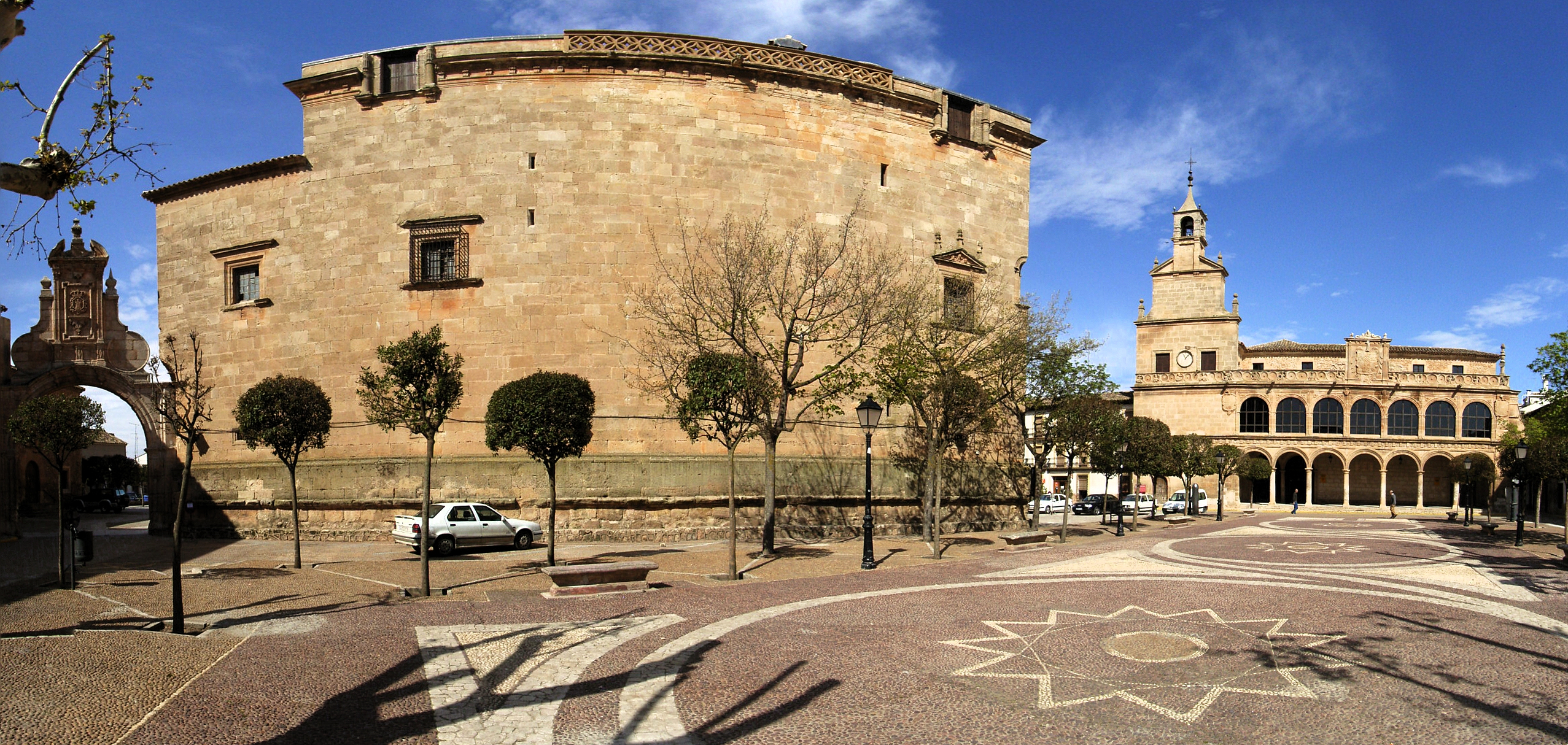
The Iglesia de Santiago Apóstol and La Casa Consistorial

- La Casa Consistorial
- Castillo de Moya
- Castle of Alarcón
- Cuenca Cathedral
- Iglesia de Santiago Apóstol in San Clemente
- Palacio de los Gosálvez
- St. Michael's Church, Mota del Cuervo
