= Saint Natalia =

Saint Natalia or Saint Natalie may refer to:

- Saint Natalia of Nicomedia (died 306), Asian martyr, see Adrian and Natalia of Nicomedia
- Saint Natalia of Córdoba (died 852), Spanish martyr, see Aurelius and Natalia
- Saint Natalia of Toulouse (died 1352), Mercedarian
