= Navalmoralejo =

- Municipality
- Coat of arms

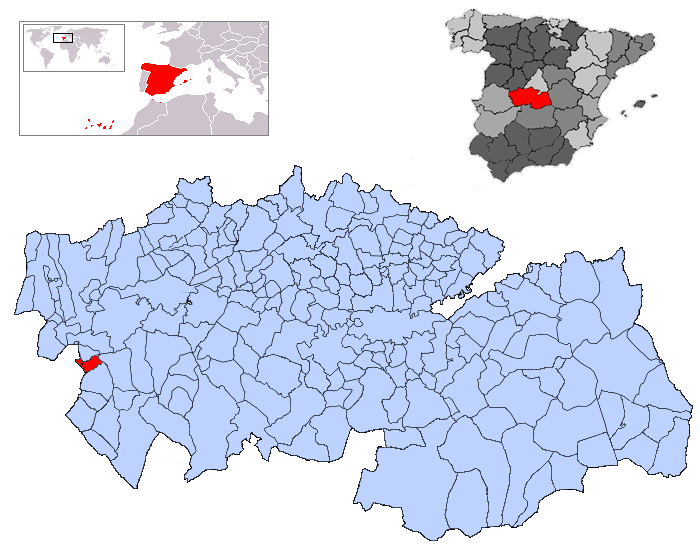

- Location in Spain
- Coordinates: 39°44′21″N 5°8′36″W
- Country: Spain
- Autonomous community: Castile-La Mancha
- Province: Toledo
- Comarca: Campana de Oropesa
- Judicial district: Talavera de la Reina

Government
  - Alcalde: Manuel Ramón Chico López (2007)

Area
  - Total: 22 km^{2} (8.5 sq mi)
- Elevation: 423 m (1,388 ft)

Population (2025-01-01)
  - Total: 56
  - Density: 2.5/km^{2} (6.6/sq mi)
- Demonym(s): Navalmoralejano, na
- Time zone: UTC+1 (CET)
  - Summer (DST): UTC+2 (CEST)
- Postal code: 45573
- Dialing code: 925

Navalmoralejo is a municipality located in the province of Toledo, Castile-La Mancha, Spain. According to the 2006 census (INE), the municipality has a population of 63 inhabitants.

== Demographics ==
Historical population
Year	Pop.	±%
1900	343	—
1910	294	−14.3%
1920	345	+17.3%
1930	377	+9.3%
1940	367	−2.7%
1950	399	+8.7%
1960	328	−17.8%
1970	193	−41.2%
1981	121	−37.3%
1991	91	−24.8%
2001	70	−23.1%
2011	67	−4.3%
2021	56	−16.4%
2023	50	−10.7%
Source: INE

== See also ==
- Ciudad de Vascos
