= Ibn Jahhaf =

Ibn Yahhaf
- Governor of the Taifa of Valencia
- Reign: Taifa of Valencia: 1092–1094
- Predecessor: Yahya al-Qadir
- Successor: Rodrigo Díaz de Vivar (El Cid)
- Died: 1095; Valencia
- Religion: Islam

Abu Ahmad Jaafar bin Abdullah bin Jahhaff al-Ma’afari or Ibn Yahhaf (died 1094) was a judge and was the last ruler of the Taifa of Valencia before it fell to El Cid in 1094.

== Biography ==
Ibn Jahhaff, previously a judge in the city of Valencia, became ruler of the Taifa of Valencia after instigating a popular revolt with support of the pro-Almoravid faction against his predecessor Yahya al-Qadir in 1092. This triggered El Cid to invade and lay siege to the city of Valencia. After the fall of the city in June 17 1094, Ibn Jahhaff was captured and executed, most likely by burning.

| Preceded by Yahya al-Qadir | King of Valencia; 1092–1094 | Succeeded by Rodrigo Díaz de Vivar (as Prince of Valencia) |
