= Serapion the Younger =

Medieval physician

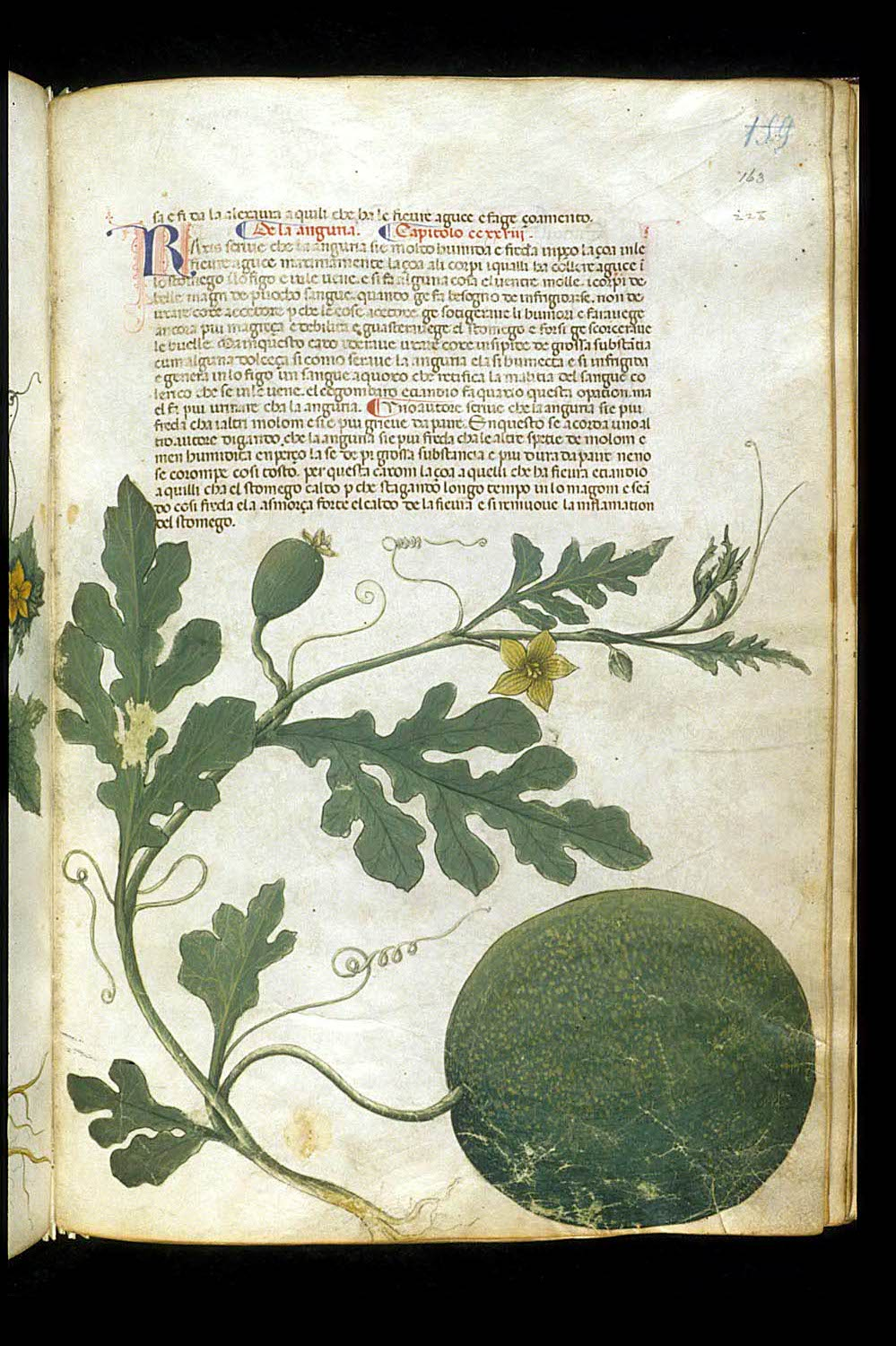
Plate depicting a melon from the "Carrara Herbal", date circa 1400, an Italian translation of a Latin translation of the book of medicaments of Serapion the Younger

Serapion the Younger wrote a medicinal-botany book titled The Book of Simple Medicaments. The book is dated to the 12th or 13th century. He is called "the Younger" to distinguish him from Serapion the Elder, aka Yahya ibn Sarafyun, an earlier medical writer with whom he was often confused. Serapion the Younger's Simple Medicaments was likely written in Arabic, but no Arabic copy survives, and there is no record of knowledge of the book among medieval Arabic authors. The book was translated to Latin in the late 13th century and was widely circulated in late medieval Latin medical circles. Portions of the Latin text make a good match with portions of a surviving Arabic text Kitab al-Adwiya al-Mufrada attributed to Ibn Wafid (died 1074 or 1067). The entire Latin text is very heavily reliant on medieval Arabic medicinal literature; and it is essentially just a compilation of such literature. It is exceedingly clear that the book was not originally written in a Latin language.

Nothing about Serapion the Younger's biography is on record anywhere. In his only book, there is a quote from something by a certain medical writer who died around 1070 (Ibn Wafid). That puts a lower bound on when Serapion the Younger wrote. It is therefore supposed he wrote in the 12th century. It remains possible he wrote in the 13th century because there is no record of the full book anywhere until the late 13th century. On the basis of his name he might have been a Christian because "Serapion" and its Arabic equivalents "Sarafyun" and "Sarabi" is a Greek name. But since the identity of this Serapion is completely unknown, his name Serapion can be a pseudepigraph, whereby he was using the authority of the name of the earlier Serapion to give more credence to his own work. He calls himself the very same name as Serapion the Elder called himself. The distinction between "the Younger" and "the Elder" was introduced later by others after it was realized that they cannot be the same person. Pseudepigraphy was common in the medieval era.

In the title Simple Medicaments, "simple" means non-compound: a practical medicine most often consisted of a mix of two or more "simples". The work was written for physicians and apothecaries. In the book's early part, Serapion the Younger classifies substances according to their medicinal properties, and discourses on their actions. The remainder and largest part of the book is a compendium of information on individual medicaments quoted from Dioscorides, Galen, and numerous named medieval Arabic writers on medicaments, with relatively brief supporting remarks by himself.

A partial copy of Serapion's book survives from the medieval era in Hebrew. One historian of medieval Arabic medicine, Lucien Leclerc (died 1893), has presented some evidence that the book might have been written in Hebrew, not withstanding that practically all of the book's information is taken from Arabic literature.

The Latin translation circulated in the 14th and 15th centuries under the title Liber Serapionis Aggregatus in Medicinis Simplicibus, and Serapionis Aggregatoris de Simplicibus Comentarii, and Liber de Simplicibus Medicamentis, and Liber de Simplici Medicina. There is also a manuscript of it in a Latin-to-Italian translation dated 1390-1404 which contains many colored illustrations of plants, and which historians have named the "Carrara Herbal". Medievally the work was sometimes coupled with the works of the elder Serapion, as they were often supposed to have been the same person. After the invention of the printing press, editions were printed in Latin in 1473 (Milan), 1479 (Venice), 1525 (Lyon) and 1531 (Strasburg). The edition of 1531 was supervised by the botanist Otto Brunfels.

Very many lengthy extracts from Serapion's book are recycled in a Latin medicine encyclopedia written by Matthaeus Silvaticus dated 1317, which was itself widely circulated in late medieval Latin and printed many times during the early decades after the invention of the printing press. In the early 16th century, leading new botany books by Peter Schöffer (first published 1484), Leonhart Fuchs (1542), Rembert Dodoens (1554), and others, contain information that is explicitly attributed to the book of Serapion (the younger).

The primary historical interest in Serapion's book arises from the fact that it was widely read by medical-botany scholars in Latin in the years 1300 – 1550 and it had a role in the transmission of medieval Arabic medicinal knowledge to the medieval Latins. It is judged today to be inferior to a comparable compilation by Ibn al-Baitar titled Book of Simple Medicaments and Foods dated 1240s. Ibn al-Baitar's book in Arabic was not translated to Latin during the medieval era.
