= Natalia of Toulouse =

Natalia of Toulouse (Spanish: Natalia de Tolosa, French: Nathalie de Toulouse) was a Mercedarian tertiary of the 14th century. She was born in Gaillac in 1312. Writing in the 17th century, Tirso de Molina attributes to her a miracle of bilocation. She reportedly appeared to a Christian from Calabria who was in slavery in Africa and was tempted by the offers of his captor to convert to Islam. She strengthened his faith until he could be ransomed.

A painting of Natalia by José Jiménez Donoso decorates one of the pendentives of the Mercedarian convent of Alarcón. She is venerated as a virgin and saint.

== Bibliography ==
- Escribano López, Ana (2022). "Aproximación a la Orden de los Mercedarios y su martirio voluntario en el norte de África en la Baja Edad Media". Nuevos trabajos en estudios medievales: historia, arte, filología, arqueología. Universidade de Santiago de Compostela. pp. 247–269. doi:10.15304/op.2022.1394.
- Olivares Martínez, Diana (2010). "Iconografía de la Beata Mariana de Jesús". Anales de Historia del Arte. Extraordinario: 239–255.
- Penedo Rey, M., ed. (1973). Historia General de la Orden de Nuestra Señora de las Mercedes, Vol. 1 (1218–1567) por Fray Gabriel Téllez (Tirso de Molina). Provincia de la Merced de Castilla.
- Rodríguez-Parada, Concepción (2013). "Female Networks around the Order of Our Lady of Mercy in the 13th-century Barcelona: An Approach to the Bibliographic and Documentary Sources for the Study of María de Cervelló and the First Mercedarian Nuns". In Blanca Garí (ed.). Women's Networks of Spiritual Promotion in the Peninsular Kingdoms (13th–16th Centuries). Viella. pp. 43–76.
- VV. AA. (1686). Histoire de l'Ordre sacré, royal et militaire de Notre-Dame de la Mercy, rédemption des Captifs, dédiée au Roy. Paris: Antoine Warin.
