= Yahya al-Qadir =

Muslim ruler in Spain (died 1092)

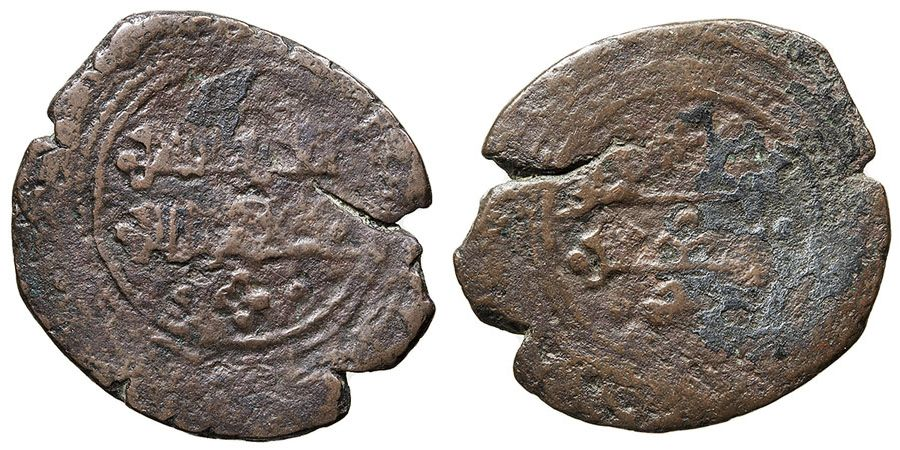
- Coinage bearing insignia of Al Qadir Yahya II (Dírhem), Taifa of Toledo

Emir of Taifa of Toledo
- Reign: 1075–1085
- Predecessor: al-Mamun
- Successor: Alfonso VI of León and Castile

Emir of Taifa of Valencia
- Reign: 1086–1092
- Predecessor: Abu Bakr ibn 'Abd al-'Aziz
- Successor: Abu Ahmad Ja'far Ibn Jahhaf

Yahya ibn Ismail ibn Yahya, known by the regnal name al-Qadir bi-llah (died 28 October 1092) was the Dhulnunid ruler of the Taifa of Toledo in Spain between 1075 until the fall of Toledo in 1085 and of the Taifa of Valencia from 1086 until his death.

== Ruler of Toledo ==
Al-Qadir succeeded his grandfather al-Mamun as the ruler of Toledo when al-Mamum was assassinated in 1075. Al-Qadir was weak in comparison to his grandfather and not as skillful in dealing with the conflict in Toledo that was present between pro-Christians and anti-Christians. As a result, he quickly lost control of affairs in Toledo and in distant territories. At his accession, the Taifa of Toledo included the Taifa of Valencia, the Taifa of Córdoba, and other southern provinces. Taking advantage of al-Qadir's difficulties in Toledo, the governor of Valencia, Abu Bakr, in 1075 stop paying tribute, declared Valencia's independence from Toledo, and reasserted local rule. Two years later in 1077, the ruler of the Taifa of Badajoz took Córdoba and other southern territories from al-Qadir and Toledo.

In late 1078 / early 1079, the populace of Toledo revolted against al-Qadir and he fled to Cuenca in the east to seek the support and assistance of Alfonso VI, King of León and Castile. The rebels who took Toledo recognized al-Mutawakkil, King of Badajoz as the new ruler of Toledo and allowed him to bring his forces into the city. In April 1079, Alfonso VI moved to reinstate al-Qadir by blocking access to Toledo and besieging the city of Coria, approximately 210 kilometers to the west in a position threatening Badajoz. After approximately five months, Coria surrendered, and the forces of Alfonso VI were posed to invade the territories of Badajoz. Faced with the invasion of his kingdom, al-Mutawakkil withdrew from Toledo and al-Qadir was reinstated.

For Alfonso VI's assistance in the recovery of Toledo, al-Qadir signed the Pact of Cuenca which allowed Alfonso VI to permanently create military garrisons in the taifa. Alfonso chose two strategic locations; one at Zorita, approximately 110 kilometers to the northeast of Toledo toward the Taifa of Zaragoza; and a second at Cantuarias, approximately 70 kilometers west of Toledo toward Badajoz. These two garrisons allowed Alfonso VI to protect al-Qadir and the Taifa of Toledo from potential attacks from both the east and the west. As such, Alfonso VI assumed responsibility for protecting and maintaining the integrity of the Taifa of Toledo. It is also believed that during this time, Alfonso VI secured al-Qadir's agreement to a secret plan whereby Alfonso VI would take possession of Toledo and, in exchange, assist al-Qadir capture and retake the throne of Valencia. For Alfonso VI, the secret agreement was a small, but important step in his long-term plan to capture the strategically located taifa and then use it to take the remainder of Al-Andalus from the Muslims.

Following the implementation of the new security arrangement, many of al-Qadir's subjects came to resent the Christian garrisons in their kingdom, the costs of maintaining those military outposts, and the payment of tribute to Alfonso VI. In May 1082, a second revolt against the rule of al-Qadir occurred. Although he was able to defeat the rebels in this revolt without the assistance of Alfonso VI, al-Qadir remained unpopular among his people and continued to struggle to hold on to power. During this time, it became evident to Alfonso VI that the continuing cost to protect al-Qadir was too high and that he should move forward and execute his plan to take direct control of the city and taifa as soon as possible.

Although Alfonso VI and al-Qadir had previously agreed to the secret agreement to convey Toledo, al-Qadir could not simply hand the domain over to a Christian king as such an act would be totally unacceptable to those opposed to Christian expansion. In Toledo, the population was deeply divided. While some were tired of the continuing turmoil and economic burden of the existing relationship, other factions including a pro-war group supported by the Taifa of Zaragoza were prepared to resist. In addition, as one among many Muslin rulers in al-Andalus during the Reconquista, al-Qadir needed to be seen among his peers as resistant to Christian expansion. As a result, al-Qadir remained on the throne of Toledo and did nothing visibly to convey the taifa to Alfonso VI.

== Siege of Toledo ==
For his part, Alfonso VI began his conquest of Toledo in 1083 by undertaking a campaign in Andalucía. He invaded the Taifa of Sevilla advancing as far as Tarifa at the extreme southern end of the Iberian peninsula. By means of this expedition, Alfonso VI demonstrated that he was strong enough to campaign with impunity and able to punish the Muslims for withholding tribute and for encouraging the opponents of al-Qadir in Toledo. In the fall of 1084, Alfonso VI's forces established a camp south of Toledo and began a formal siege of Toledo designed to prevent the flow of provisions into the city. Throughout the fall and winter seasons, al-Qadir and his forces remained within the city and took no military actions against their besiegers. After spending the winter in his kingdom, Alfonso VI traveled to Toledo with additional forces arriving in approximately mid-March of 1085.

The army and supply train of Alfonso VI were believed to have been large enough to convince the citizens of Toledo that resistance would be ultimately futile. Negotiations were initiated while the siege continued. Al-Qadir appealed to the rulers of the other Muslim taifas asking for assistance, making it clear that without their aid Toledo would have to be surrendered. No response was received to al-Qadir's pleas. Negotiations continued and an agreement was reached on 6 May 1085. As a part of the agreement Alfonso Vi agreed to assist al-Qadir retake the throne of Valencia. In addition, Alfonso VI allowed Muslims who desired to stay in Toledo under Christian rule to retain their possessions with the freedom to practice their religion. Those who chose to leave the city were allowed to do so with the freedom to take their possessions. On 25 May 1085, Alfonso VI formally entered the city of Toledo.

== Ruler of Valencia ==
After Alfonso VI conquered Toledo in 1085, he followed through and fulfilled his secret agreement to assist al-Qadir regain the throne of Valencia. When the original agreement was made, Valencia was governed by members of the Ibn Abd al-Aziz family. Abu Bakr had been the ruler of Valencia since 1075. However, Abu Bakr, died in May 1085 just as Alfonso VI was capturing Toledo. Abu Bakr was succeeded by his son, Uthman ibn Abu Bakr.

To secure Valencia for al-Qadir, Alfonso VI utilized a combination of intimidation and military force. First, to clear the path and neutralize potential threats from rival Muslim factions, Alfonso VI besieged Zaragoza. Concurrently, he sent Álvar Fáñez with a large military force to Valencia, to place al-Qadir on the throne.

Faced with the might of Alfonso VI’s army, the city of Valencia surrendered in March 1086. Uthman was ousted from power and al-Qadir installed as the emir. Al-Qadir reigned in Valencia from 1086 to 1092 as a vassal of Alfonso VI. His rule was unstable, unpopular, and dependent upon the protection of Alfonso VI. When the Almoravids invaded in 1086, it was Alfonso VI's requirement that al-Qadir and Valencia support the Christians at the Battle of Sagrajas. Such a posture eventually would lead to popular revolt in 1092 instigated by Ibn Yahhaf with the support of a pro-Almoravid faction in the city. Al-Qadir was deposed and executed on 28 October of that year.

Regnal titles
Preceded by Yahya al-Mamun	Emir of Toledo; 1075–1085	Succeeded by Alfonso VI of León
Preceded by Abu Bakr	Emir of Valencia; 1086–1092	Succeeded by Ibn Jahhaf
