= Mota del Cuervo =

- Municipality
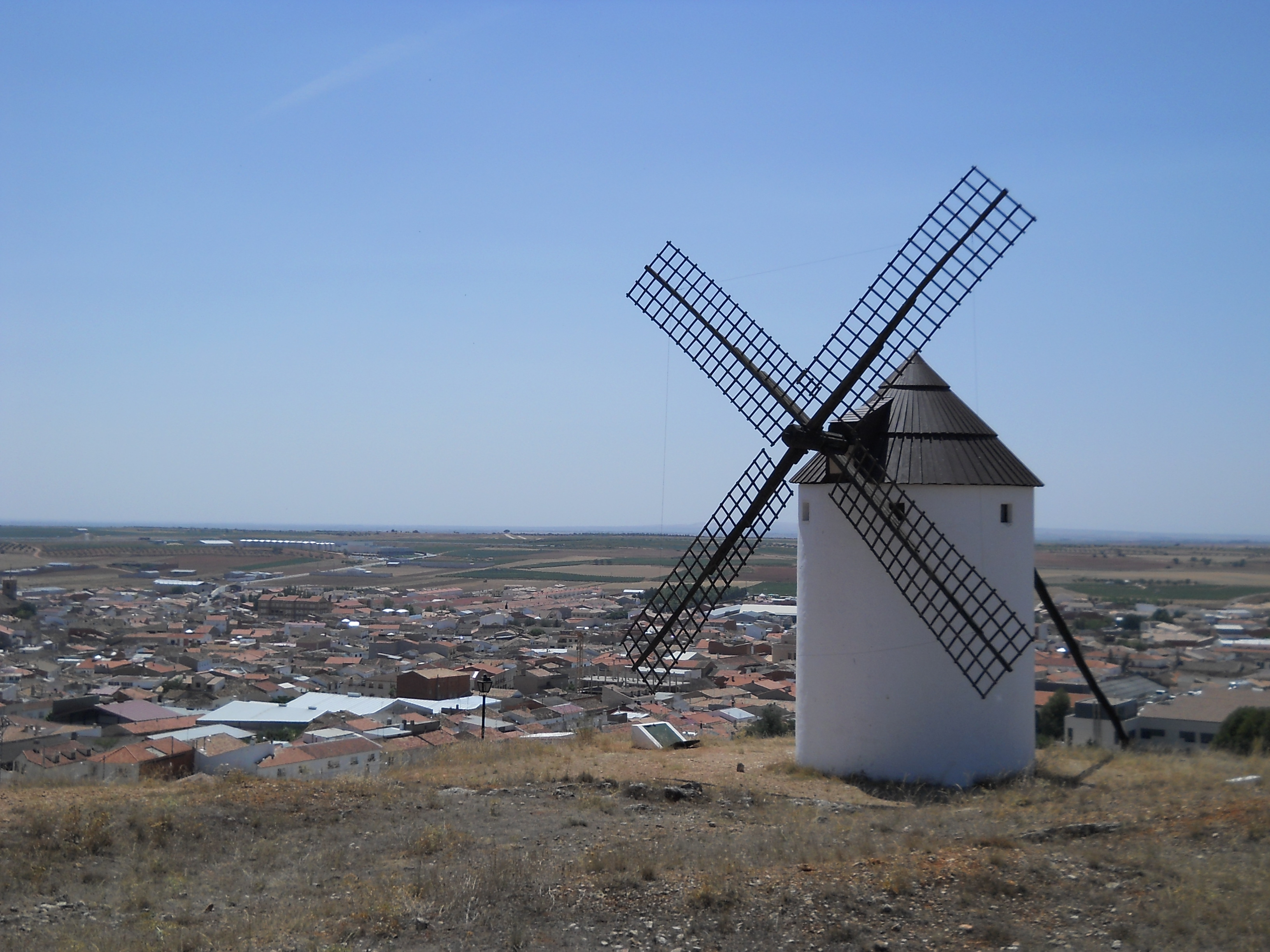

- Seal Coat of arms

- Location within Castilla-La Mancha Location within Spain
- Coordinates: 39°30′N 2°52′W
- Country: Spain
- Autonomous community: Castilla–La Mancha
- Province: Cuenca

Area
  - Total: 176.19 km^{2} (68.03 sq mi)

Population (2025-01-01)
  - Total: 6,089
  - Density: 34.56/km^{2} (89.51/sq mi)
- Time zone: UTC+1 (CET)
  - Summer (DST): UTC+2 (CEST)

Mota del Cuervo is a municipality of Spain located in the province of Cuenca, Castilla–La Mancha. The municipality spans across a total area of 176.19 km^{2} and, as of 1 January 2020, it has a registered population of 6,055.

It is one of the few locations in Spain where pottery has been a primarily female-dominated activity. Lying at the feet of a hill chain with windmills, other landmarks include the parish church, the former convent of the Trinitaries and the residence of Fray Alonso Cano.
