= Ismail al-Zahir =

1st Dhulnunid Emir of Toledo Taifa

1st Emir of Toledo Taifa
- Reign: 1032 – 1043
- Predecessor: Hisham III (as Caliph of Cordoba)
- Successor: Yahya al-Mamun
- Born: unknown date Córdoba, Al-Andalus
- Died: 1043; Toledo, Al-Andalus, Taifa of Toledo (now part of Spain)
- Burial: Toledo
Names
- Ismail bin Abd al-Rahman bin Di-l-Nun
- Dynasty: Dhulnunid (founder)
- Father: Abd al-Rahman bin Di-l Nun
- Religion: Islam

Ismail b. Abd al-Rahman b. Di-l-Nun (died 1043 in Toledo), also known as Ismaíl al-Zafir, Ismaíl az-Záfir or simply “Al-Zafir” (the victor) was the first ruler of the Taifa of Toledo from the Dhulnunid dynasty. He reigned from 1032 until his death in 1043 when he was succeeded by his son Al-Mamun.

== Biography ==
Ismaíl al-Zafir was the son of Abd al-Rahman ibn Di-l-Nun, governor of Santaver, Huete, Uclés and Cuenca. In 1018, when he came of age, his father gave him the government of Uclés in his name, and later sent him to Toledo at the request of its citizens who were dissatisfied with their rulers. Here Al-Zafir consolidated a new taifa in 1032. His sister married Yahya al-Muzáffar, ruler of the Taifa of Zaragoza, with whom she was the mother of Mundir II.

Among al-Zafir’s hobby was poetry and he wrote several poems. He was a patron of science and art, specifically literature; interests that his son Al-Mamún would later continue.

He died in 1043.

| Preceded by Hisham III (as Caliph of Córdoba) | King of Toledo; 1032–1043 | Succeeded by Yahya al-Mamun |
