= Dhunnunid dynasty =

11th-century Berber dynasty in modern-day Spain

The Dhunnunid dynasty or Dhulnunid dynasty, known in Arabic sources as Banū Dhī n-Nūn (Arabic: ﺑﻨﻮ ذي اﻟﻨﻭﻦ) was a Muslim dynasty of Berber origin that had become Arabized. They reigned over the Taifa of Toledo in al-Andalus in the 11th century.

== Origins ==
The Dhunnunids were a Berber family from the Hawwara tribe who came to the Iberian Peninsula at the time of the Islamic conquest. They settled in the heart of Santabariyya or Shant Bariya (Santaver in the Province of Cuenca) and through a process of cultural Arabization between the 8th-10th centuries changed their name from the Berber Zennún to the Arabised form dhi-l-Nun. The Banū Dhī al-Nūn are among the Arabized Berbers long established in al-Andalus and states that they claimed an Arab origin. According to ibn 'Idhari, the family’s original name was Dhannūn, a common Berber name.

During the second half of the 9th century they came to control a large territory that included Uclés, Huete, Cuenca, Huélamo, Las Valeras, Alarcón and Iniesta. Due to the geographic isolation of the area, they were in continuous revolt against the Caliphate of Córdoba, maintaining a certain independence, and periodically threatening Toledo.

With the decline of the Umayyad caliphate in the early 11th century, caliph Sulayman ibn al-Hakam granted Abd el-Rahman ibn Di-l-Nun the lordship of Santaver, Huete, Uclés and Cuenca, along with the title of Násir ad-Dawla. In 1018 this same Abd al-Rahman entrusted the government of Uclés to his son Ismaíl whom he also sent him to Toledo at the request of its people, who were dissatisfied with their rulers.

== The Taifa of Toledo ==
This dynasty provided the three rulers to the Taifa of Toledo:

- Ismail al-Zahir (1023–1043)
- al-Mamun (1043–1075), son of Ismail
- Yahya al-Qadir (1075–1080), grandson of al-Mamun, also a ruler of the Taifa of Valencia.

Al-Qadir was so unpopular that Toledo rebelled against him and he was obliged to seek the support of Alfonso VI of León and Castile to regain his capital. Although he was successful, he eventually ceded the city to Alfonso in return for the king's support in installing him in Valencia. This brought the Taifa of Toledo to and end, and al-Qadir's rule in Valencia was brought to and end by the invading the Almoravids in 1092.
