= San Miguel, Mota del Cuervo =

St. Michael's Church
- Iglesia de San Miguel Arcángel
- Iglesia de San Miguel
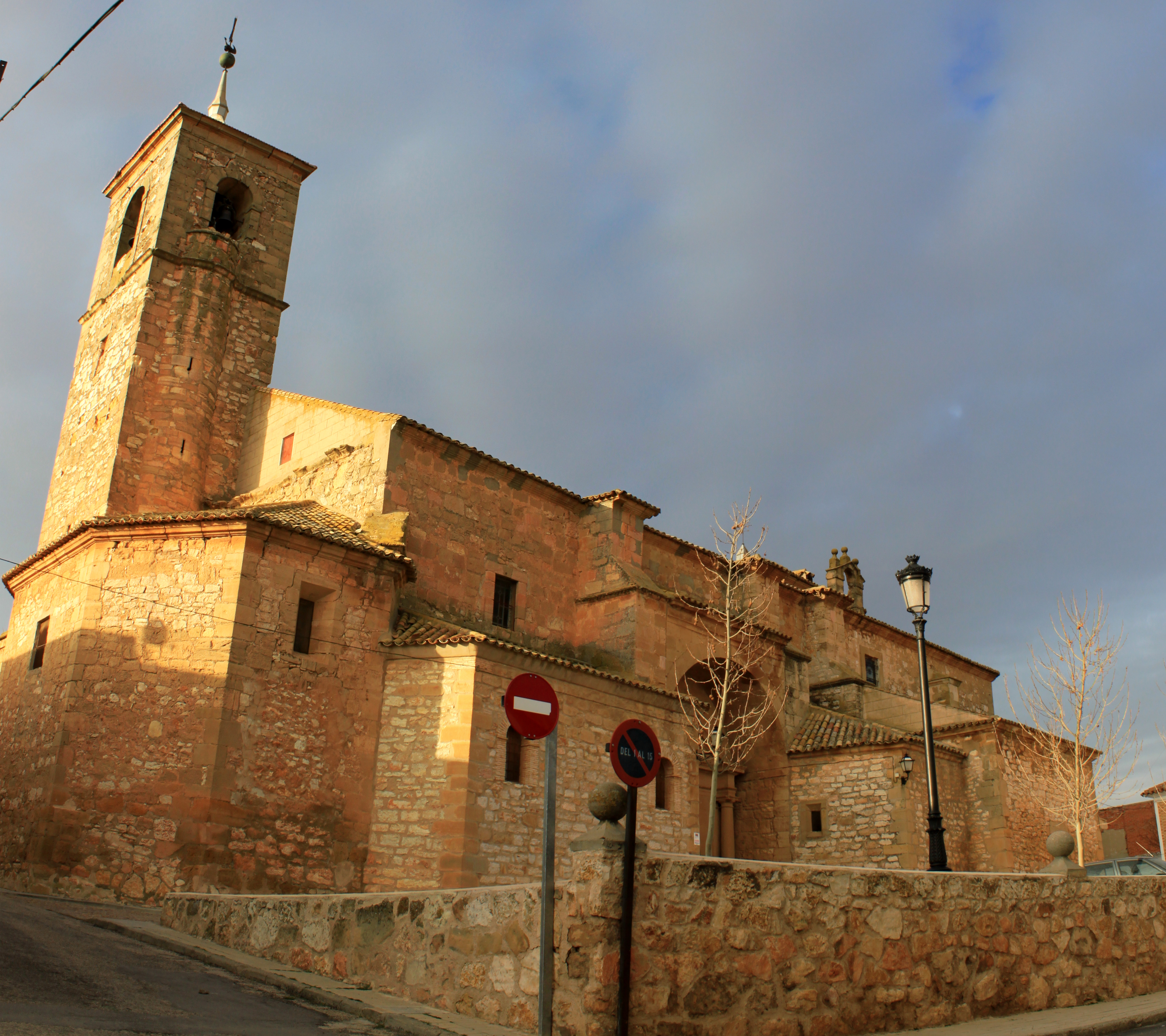
- St. Michael's Church
- 39.4987°N 2.8707°W
- Location: Mota del Cuervo, Cuenca
- Address: Calle Ramón y Cajal Baja, 32
- Country: Spain
- Denomination: Catholic Church

History
- Status: Parish church
- Founded: 15th century
- Dedication: Saint Michael the Archangel

Architecture
- Functional status: Active

Administration
- Archdiocese: Toledo
- Diocese: Cuenca

Clergy
- Bishop: José María Yanguas Sanz

St. Michael's Church (Spanish: Iglesia de San Miguel or Iglesia de San Miguel Arcángel) is a Catholic parish church in the Diocese of Cuenca, situated on Ramón y Cajal Baja Street in Mota del Cuervo, province of Cuenca, Spain. It was declared a Bien de Interés Cultural in 1990.

== Architecture ==
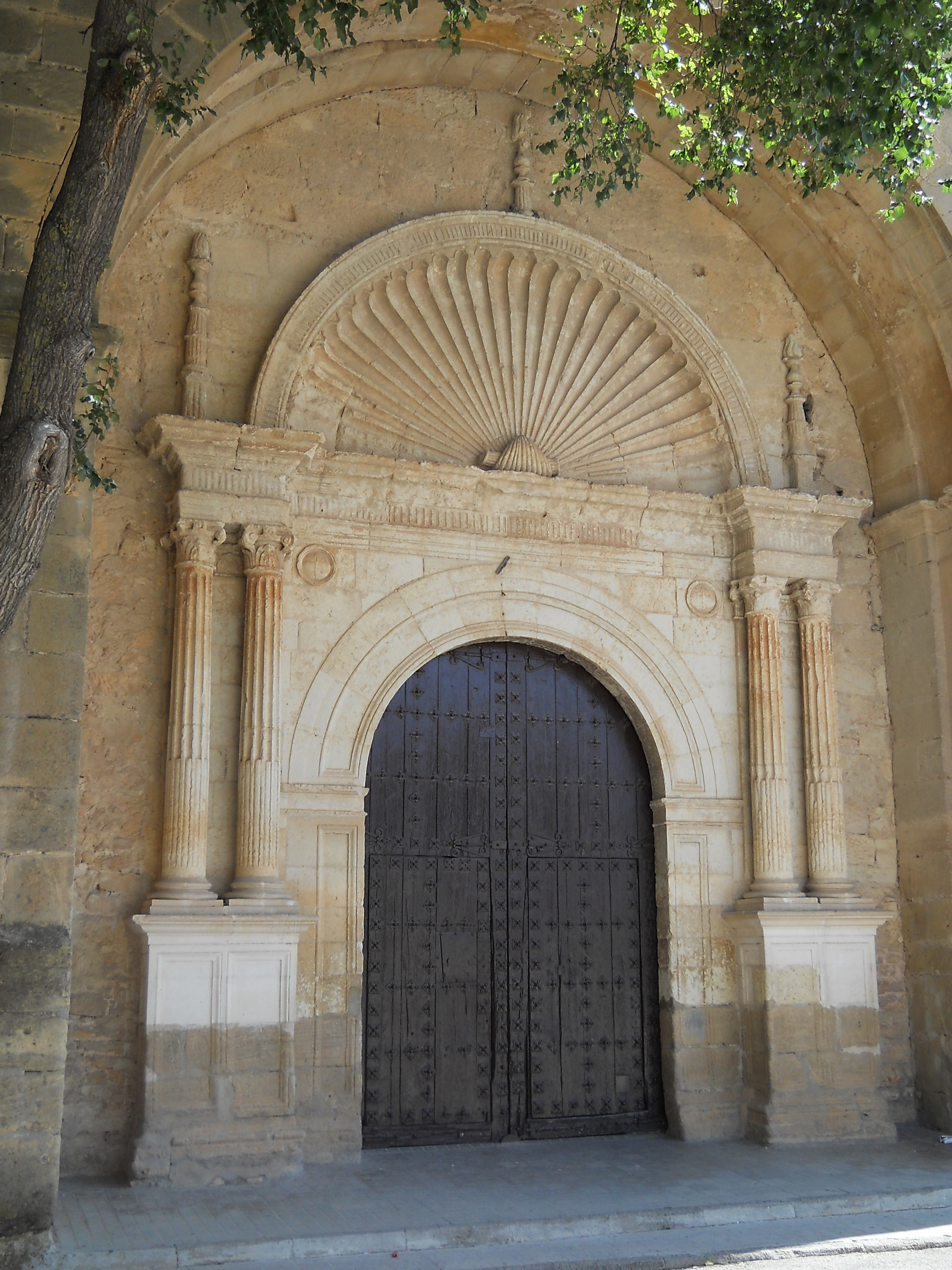
North portal of St. Michael's

Construction of the church began in the late 15th century and would continue through the 16th and 17th centuries. The visit of the Order of Santiago in 1494, which collaborated in the construction, is very illustrative to look at the state in which the church was at the end of the 15th century.

It consists of a hall with three naves, each with three aisles, an apse with two chapels, one on each side, a choir, and a bell tower at one end. The interior walls are simply whitewashed. The reredos behind the altar includes a statue depicting the Archangel Michael and the Devil placed in the centre. There was a golden altarpiece occupying the rear of the main altar during the 16th century, with blue background, statues in their niches and a tabernacle, which was lost without knowing how and why.

The exterior is made of ashlar masonry, framing rectangular windows in the central body and circular windows in the chevet. The bays of the naves are covered with ribbed, sail and groined vaults.

The choir is elevated forming a portico with three arches. The central elliptical arch is wider than the others, whose intrados is decorated with a rope-like helical motif that denotes a clear influence of the 15th-century Levantine Gothic. The alfarje ceiling is particularly of interest.

The church has several chapels, among which are the Chapel of Baptism, with a lowered vault; the Chapel of the Most Blessed Sacrament, of a polygonal plan with ashlar masonry; the Chapel of Solitude with a lunette dome; the Chapel of Jesus the Nazarene and the Chapel of the Christ at the Column.

The north portal is constructed in the Plateresque style and supported by two large buttresses. It has a semicircular arch flanked by paired Corinthian columns on plinths, an entablature topped by a large scallop shell with pinnacle decoration on both sides. Above the door, two symbols of the Order of Santiago are carved in circles, indicating the Order's collaboration in the construction of the church and in the repopulation of the area. The south portal is much simpler in structure, built in Doric style with pediment and typical Herrerian spheres as decorative applications.

== See also ==
- Catholic Church in Spain
