= Palacio de los Gosálvez =

Coordinates: 39.2957°N 2.0686°W

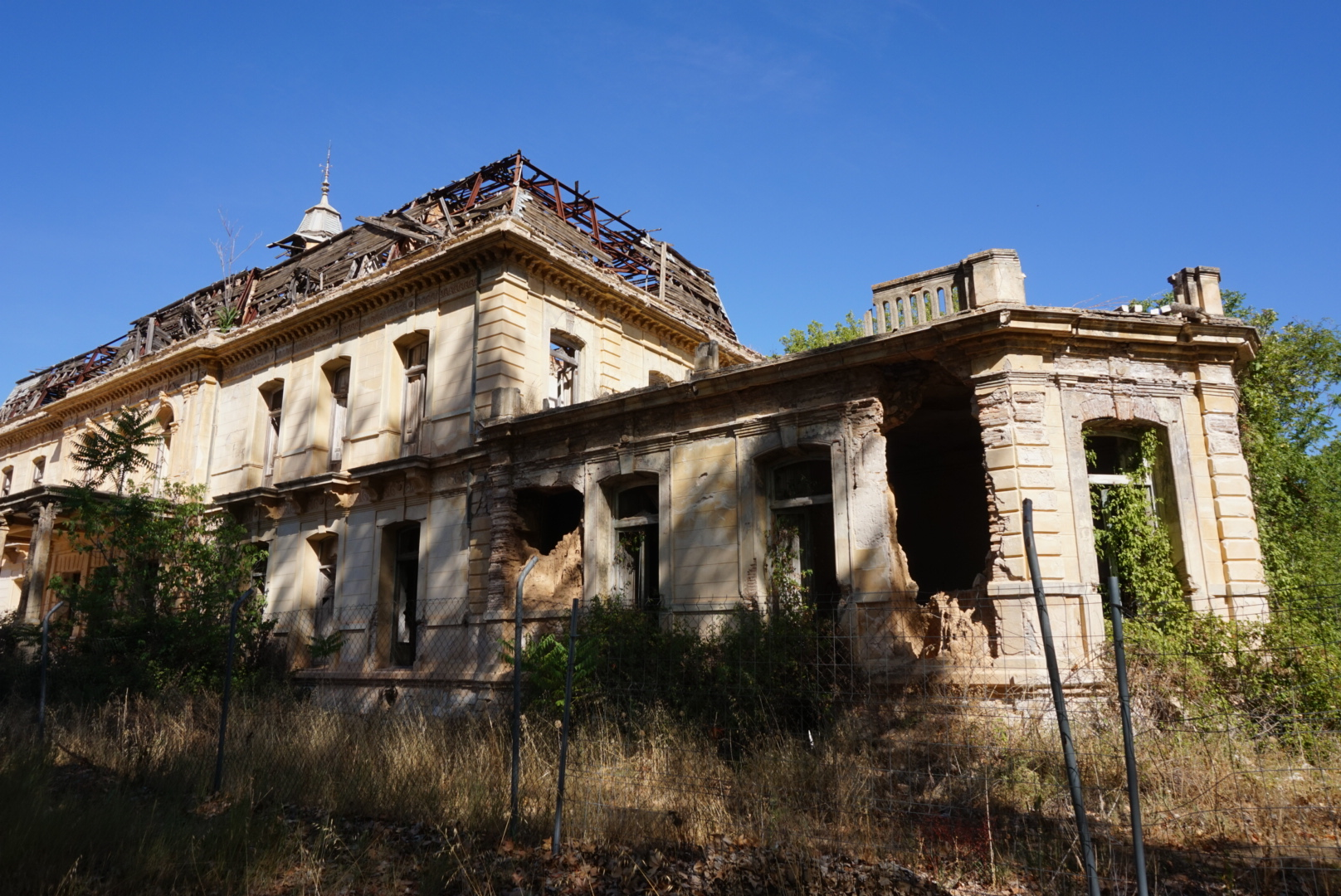
Palacio de los Gosálvez

Palacio de los Gosálvez is a palace in Villalgordo del Júcar in the Province of Albacete, Spain. It was built in 1902 by Enrique Gosálvez.
