= Alarcón =

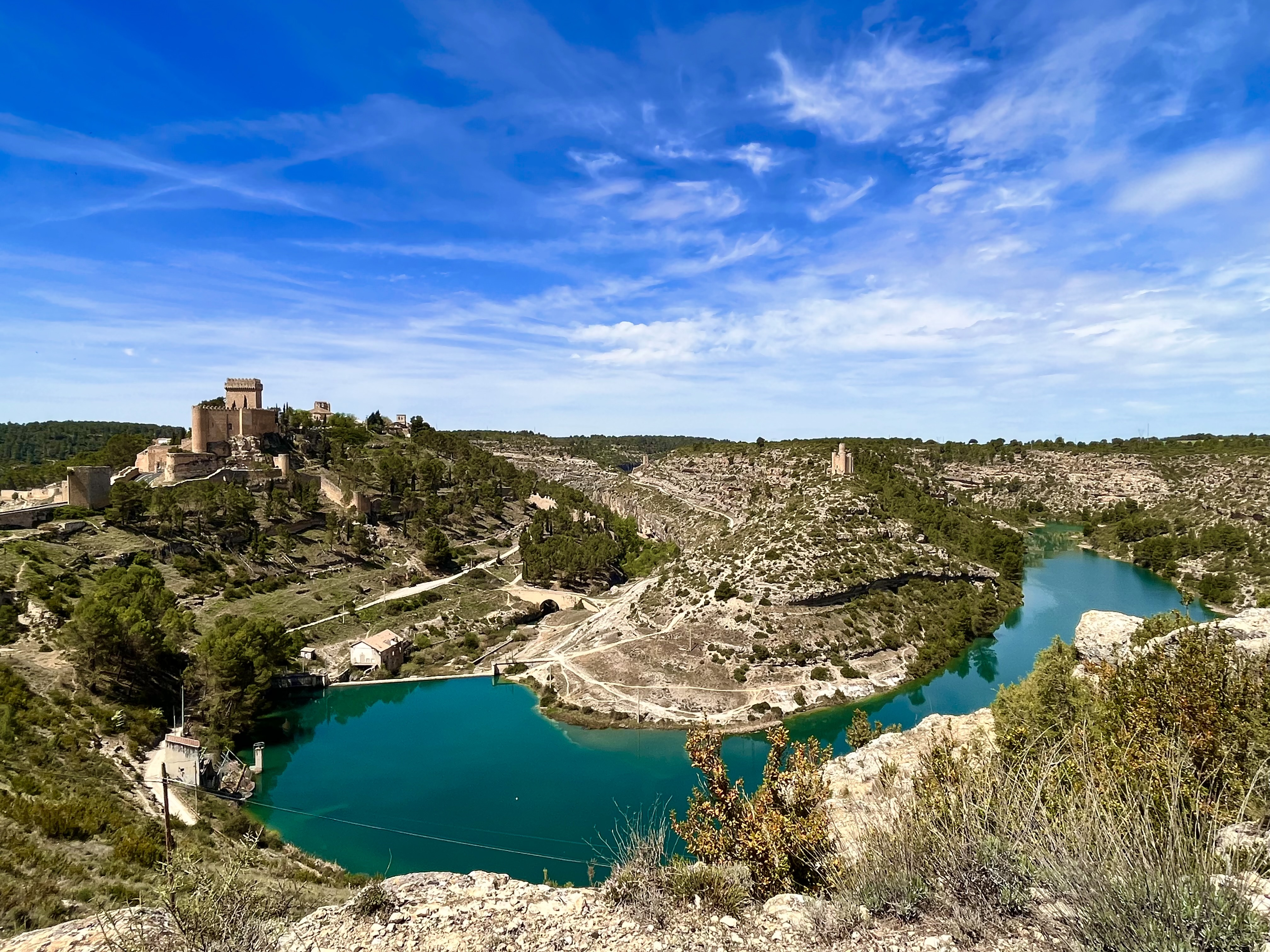
- General view of Alarcón.

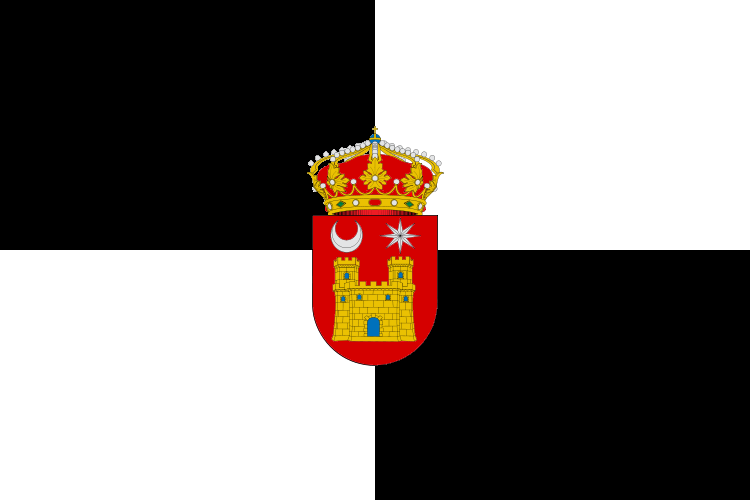
- Flag Coat of arms

- Location within Spain
- Coordinates: 39°33′N 2°5′W
- Country: Spain
- Autonomous community: Castile-La Mancha
- Province: Cuenca
- Comarca: La Manchuela

Government
  - Mayor: Pedro María Párraga Villajos

Area
  - Total: 120 km^{2} (46 sq mi)
- Elevation: 831 m (2,726 ft)

Population (2025-01-01)
  - Total: 173
  - Density: 1.4/km^{2} (3.7/sq mi)
- Time zone: UTC+1 (CET)
  - Summer (DST): UTC+2 (CEST)
- Bien de interés cultural: RI-53-0000247 as a Historic-Artistic Grouping since July 3, 1981
- Website: Official website

Alarcón is a municipality in the province of Cuenca, in the autonomous community of Castilla-La Mancha, Spain.

== Geography ==
Located 87 kilometers (54 miles) south of the city of Cuenca, Alarcón spans an area of 120 km^{2} (50 sq mi) at an elevation of 831 meters (2,726 feet). It is situated on a promontory within a closed bend of the Júcar. Not far downstream from the Alarcón Dam, an important reservoir, the town also has the smaller Dam of Henchidero at its doorstep.

== Demographics ==
According to the 2013 municipal registry of the National Statistics Institute (INE, Instituto Nacional de Estadística), the town population of 159 inhabitants yields a density of 1.3 people per km^{2} (3.4 per sq mi).

Demographic evolution of Alarcón (Spain) between 1842 and 2013

Year	Pop.	±%
1842	891	—
1877	829	−7.0%
1887	872	+5.2%
1897	768	−11.9%
1900	802	+4.4%
1910	846	+5.5%

Year	Pop.	±%
1920	877	+3.7%
1930	855	−2.5%
1940	895	+4.7%
1950	1,258	+40.6%
1960	785	−37.6%
1970	422	−46.2%

Year	Pop.	±%
1981	253	−40.0%
1991	227	−10.3%
2001	184	−18.9%
2011	180	−2.2%
2014	149	−17.2%

- 1814–2011: De jure population according to the INE.
- 2014: Population according to the 2014 municipal registry.

== History ==
Of Iberian and Roman origins, Alarcón first appears in recorded history at its occupation by the Arabs, to whom it owes the construction of the primitive castle on which the existing one is based. The history of Alarcón is governed by its role as a stronghold; however, the castle is not the town's only precious heritage: it also claims a rich architectural variety, both religious (the Churches of Santo Domingo de Silos, San Juan Bautista, the Santa Trinidad, and Santa María del Campo, as well as the Hermitage of Santa María de la Orden), and civil (the town hall, the House of Villena, and the Castañeda Palace).

The town of Alarcón was declared the site of a Historic-Artistic Grouping (Conjunto Histórico-Artistico) on July 3, 1981.

In 1994, artist Jesús Mateo began a project to paint the interior of the old Church of San Juan Bautista, creating the Mural Paintings of Alarcón (1994–2002), which were recognized by UNESCO in 1997 for their global artistic interest.

== Notable people ==
- Juan de Alarcón (1395 – after 1451), Augustinian writer who expounded the Bible at the monastery of his order in Florence, Italy, and at various monasteries in Valladolid and other places
- Juan Manuel, Prince of Villena, author of the famous Tales of Count Lucanor (Libro de los ejemplos del conde Lucanor y de Patronio)
- Jesús Mateo (born 1971), Spanish painter and author of the Mural Paintings of Alarcón

== Government ==
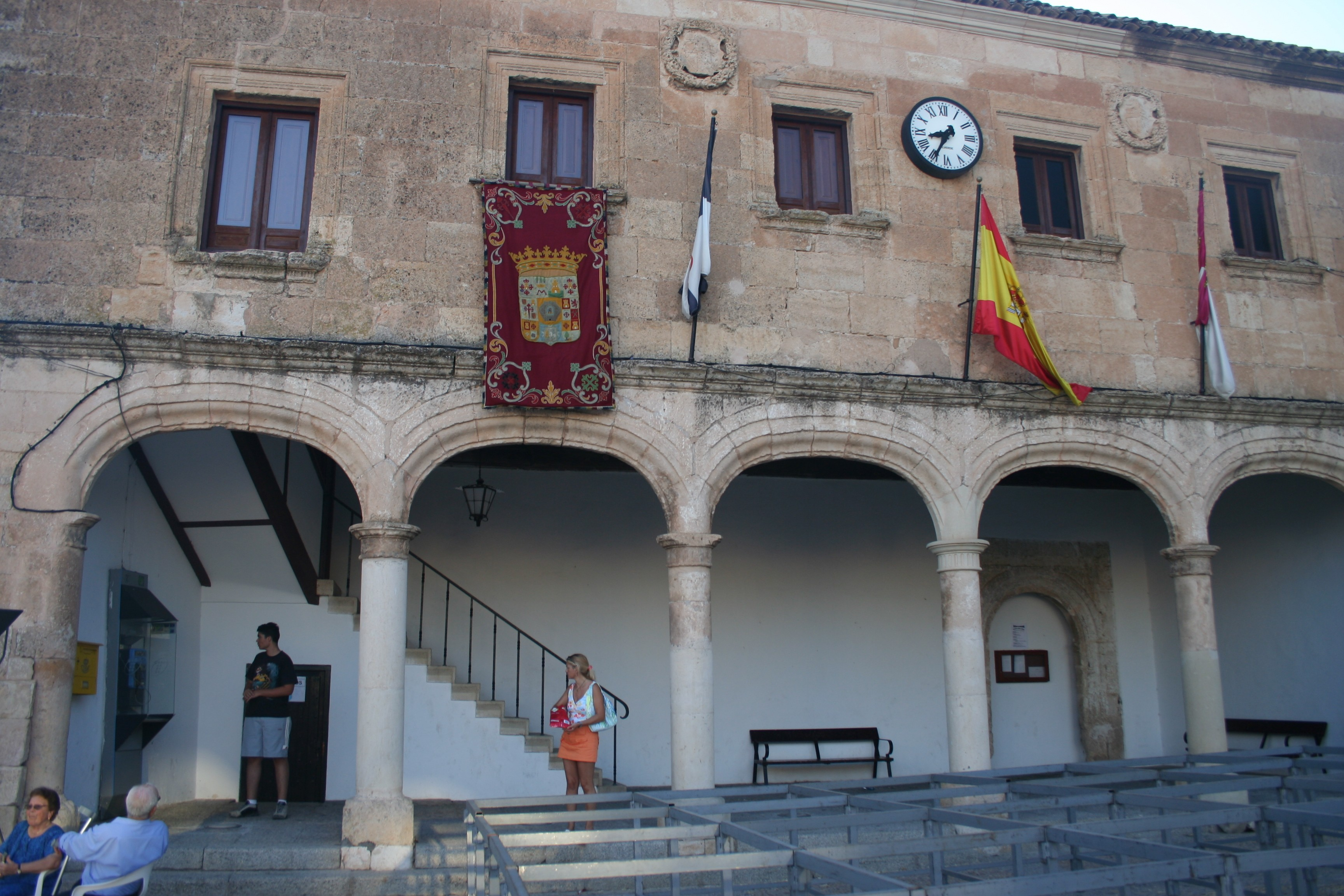
Town Hall of Alarcón

List of mayors since the democratic elections of 1979
Term	Mayor	Political party
1979–1983		
1983–1987		
1987–1991		
1991–1995		
1995–1999		
1999–2003		
2003–2007	Raúl Poveda Martínez	Partido Independiente de Alarcón (Independent Party of Alarcón, PIA)
2007–2011	Jesús Poveda Tévar	Partido Socialista Obrero Español (PSOE, Spanish Socialist Workers' Party)
2011–2015	Pedro María Párraga Villajos	Unidos por Alarcón
2015–2019	n/d	n/d
2019–2023	n/d	n/d
2023–	n/d	n/d

== Monuments ==
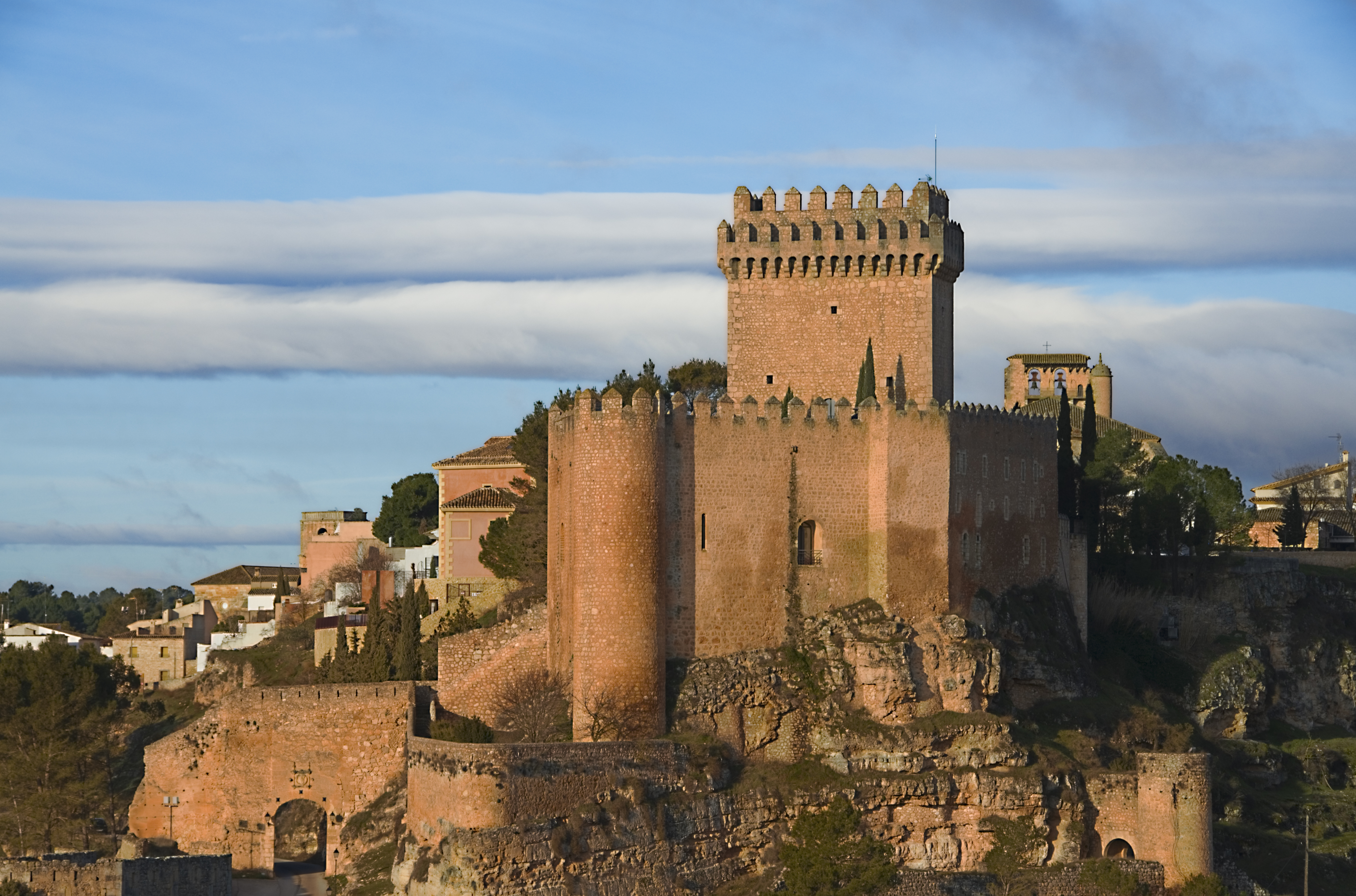
Castle of Alarcón

=== Castle of Alarcón ===
Of Muslim origin, this medieval fortress was constructed in the 8th century and conquered by King Alfonso VIII in 1184. The castle sits atop a promontory inside a bend of the Júcar River, creating a formidable stronghold whose battlements provide an impressive view to the border with Valencia. The keep, built around 1460 by Castilian nobleman Juan Pacheco, serves as the fortress's trademark feature. The historical figure Juan Manuel, Prince of Villena, who wrote the Tales of Count Lucanor, once lived within the castle walls.

The fortress was restored on various occasions throughout its history. In 1963, after years of neglect, the castle was expropriated from the Torrijos family by politician Manuel Fraga and subsequently restored by the national tourism organization Turespaña, who opened its doors as a Parador hotel in 1966. Tours of the castle are currently offered by local guides.

=== Church of Santo Domingo de Silos ===
This 13th century church was built in the late Romanesque style. Of the original structure, both the semicircular apse in the nave and the southern portal have been preserved. The portal's splayed arch consists of three colonnettes per doorjamb, capped by pointed proto-Gothic archivolts. In the 16th century, the square tower and the walls of the nave were built following Renaissance designs, while the Baroque period saw the modification of the ceiling with a ribbed barrel vault. Today the church has been adapted for use as an exhibition hall and auditorium. It was declared a national monument on February 19, 1992.

=== Art Center – The Murals of Alarcón; Old Church of San Juan Bautista ===
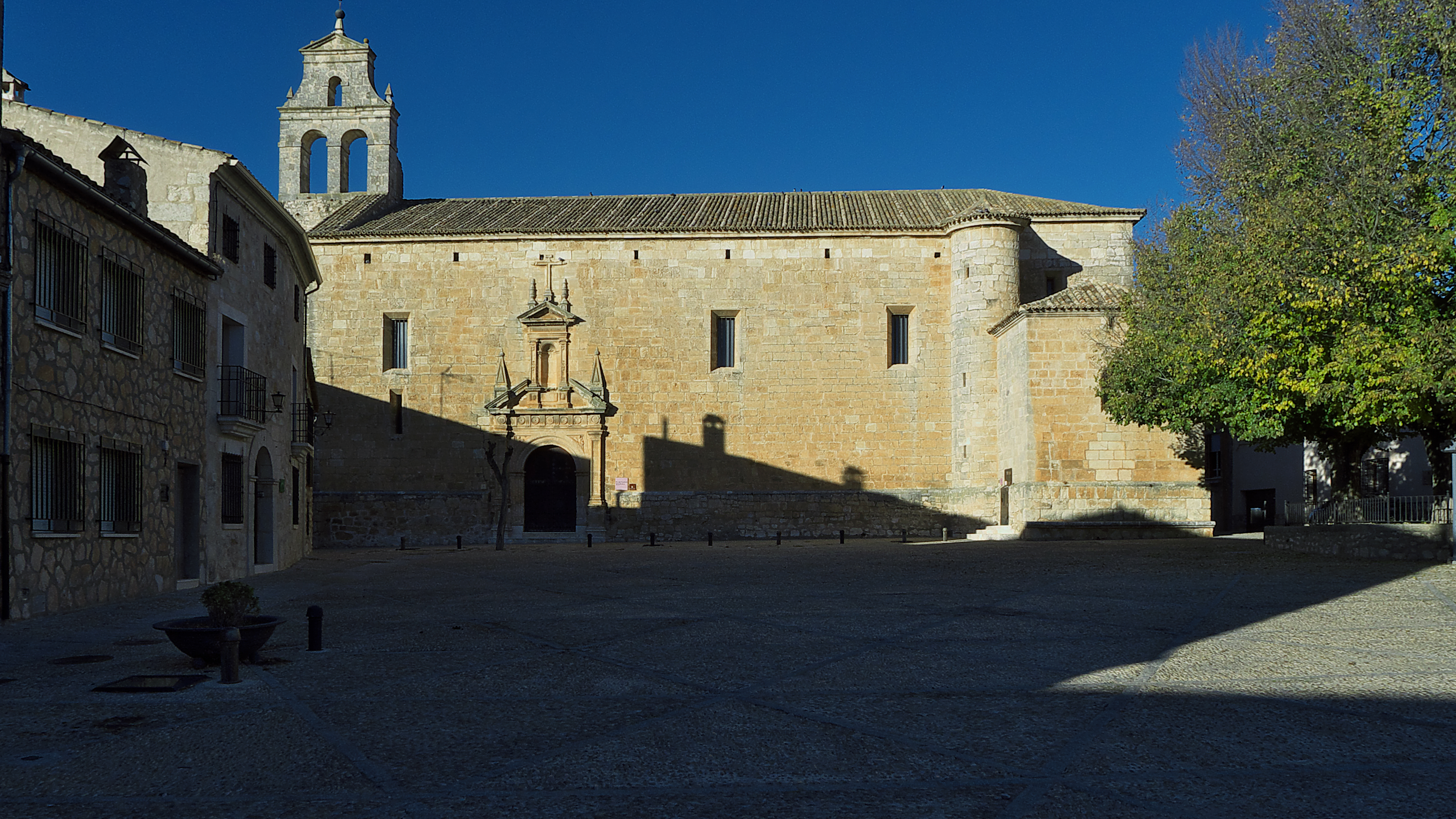
Church of San Juan Bautista

The current structure dates from the 16th century as a replacement of the previous Romanesque building. It has a single nave covered with a barrel vault, a portal in the Herrerian style, and a tower that remains from the original church. Buttresses stabilize the lateral walls; however, contrary to custom, they are located in the interior and thus divide the space into smaller areas that serve as tiny chapels. In 1995, the young Spanish painter Jesús Mateo began the project of covering the totality of the old structure in a set of mural paintings. UNESCO has officially sponsored this work since 1997 for its global artistic interest, as it is considered one of the greatest examples of contemporary art worldwide. It has drawn more than 40,000 visitors annually since its opening to the public, and received support from many scholars and artists.

=== Church of the Santa Trinidad ===
This structure comprises two naves, dating from the 13th and 16th centuries respectively, although the vault in the older nave was built in the 15th century. Of note are its pointed ribbed side arches, its chancel arch, and its Renaissance altar. The original Romanesque apse, circular in form, has been replaced by the current rectangular one. The portal is typically Plateresque; it bears the coats of arms of the Marquis of Villena, Diego López Pacheco, and of his contemporary, Bishop Diego Ramírez Villaescusa. The church tower stands on a portal known as the arco de la villa (town gate).

=== Church of Santa María del Campo ===
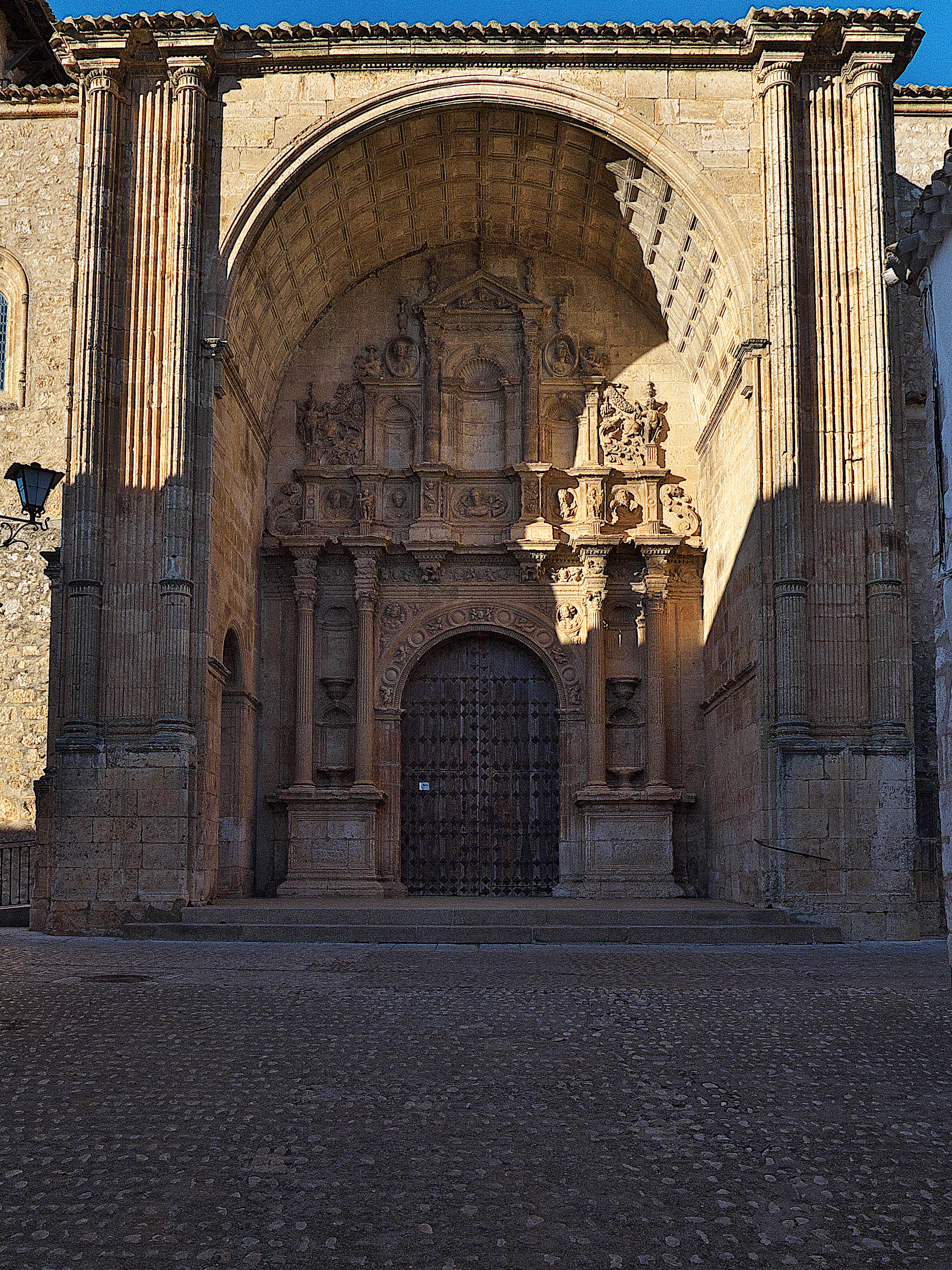
Church of Santa María del Campo. Portal.

This building presently serves as a parish church. Erected at the beginning of the 16th century, it was constructed in the Plateresque style and features Gothic tracery in the vault. The portal dates from the middle of the same century and was built by Esteban Jamete (born Etienne Jamet) of Orléans, who is also supposed to have made the altarpiece with scenes from the life of the Virgin Mary, as well as the sacristy.

== See also ==
- List of municipalities in Cuenca
- List of Bienes de Interés Cultural in the Province of Cuenca
- List of castles in Spain
