= Al-Mamun of Toledo =

Emir of Toledo from 1043 to 1075

Yahya ibn Ismail al-Mamun
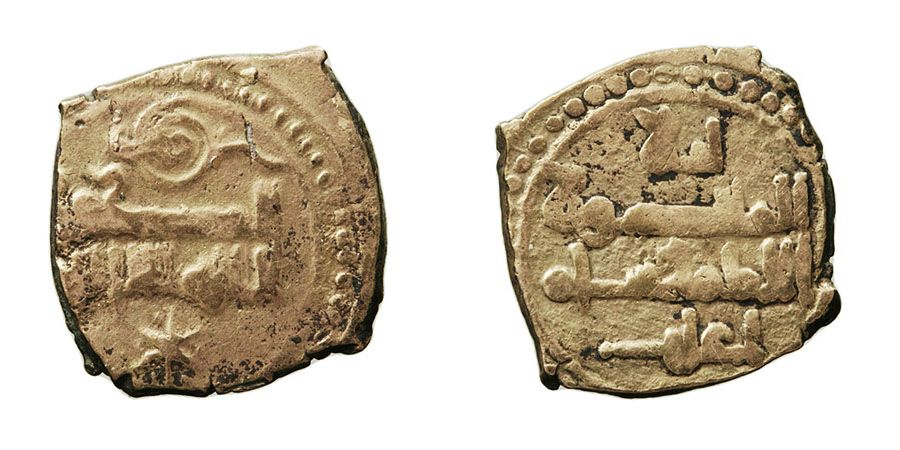
- Dinar of Al-Mamun

Emir of Toledo Taifa
- Reign: 1043 – 1075
- Predecessor: Ismail al-Zahir
- Successor: Yahya al-Qadir
- Died: 1075; Cordoba
- Dynasty: Dhunnunid
- Religion: Islam

Yahya ibn Ismail al-Mamun (Arabic: المأمون بن ذي النون) (died 1075) was the second ruler of the Berber Hawwara Dhunnunid dynasty who was king of the Taifa of Toledo between 1043 and 1075.

== Biography ==
Yahya ibn Ismail succeeded his father Ismail ibn Dhi'n-Nun in 1043. He died at Córdoba in 1075.

Preceded by Ismail al-Zahir	King of Toledo; 1043–1075	Succeeded by Yahya al-Qadir
