= Dhunnunid conquest of Valencia =

1065 conquest of Valencia in Spain by Toledo

Conquest of Valencia
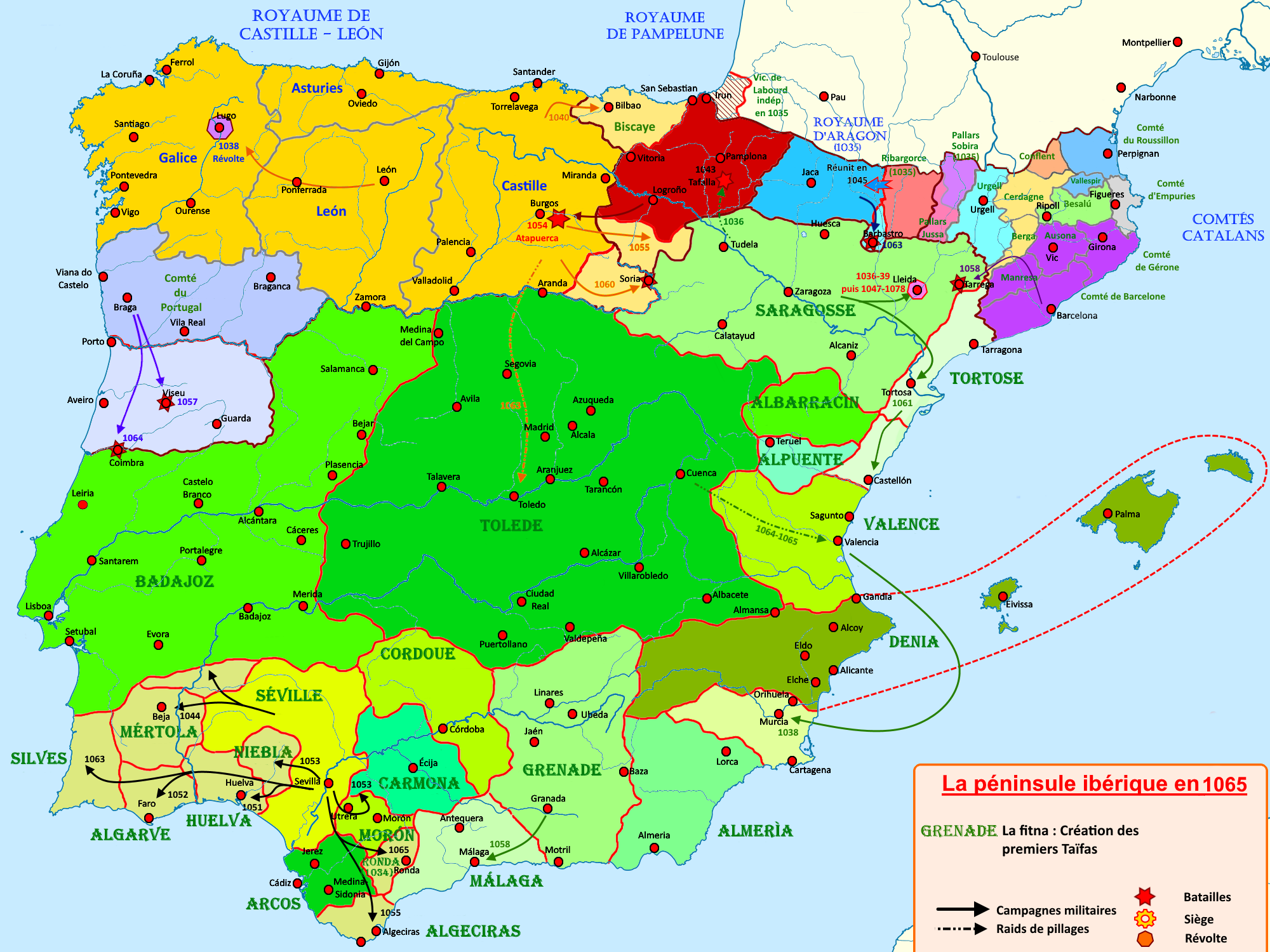
- The Taifa kingdoms in 1065
Date	1065
Location	Valencia
Result	Dhunnunid victory: The Taifa of Toledo annexes the Taifa of Valencia

Belligerents
Dhunnunid Taifa of Toledo	Amirid Taifa of Valencia

Commanders and leaders
Al-Mamun of Toledo	Abd al-Malik ibn Abd al-Aziz al-Muzaffar

Strength
Unknown	Unknown

Casualties and losses
Unknown	Unknown

The Dhunnunid conquest of Valencia was a military conquest of the city of Valencia capital of the Taifa of Valencia by the Dhunnunid dynasty of the Taifa of Toledo, the conquest was led by al-Mamun of Toledo, emir of Toledo, eventually annexing the Taifa of Valencia with its capital adding it to the Taifa of Toledo realm in 1065.

== Background ==
Valencia was the capital of the Taifa of Valencia which was ruled by the Saqaliba between 1010-1021 and then by the Amirids between 1021 and 1065, the Taifa was stabilized in 1021 under the grandson of Almanzor Abd al-Aziz al-Mansur, who was succeeded by his son Abd al-Malik ibn Abd al-Aziz al-Muzaffar also a son-in-law of al-Mamun of Toledo. Al-Mamun supported his son-in-law against Ferdinand I of León's expedition to Valencia in 1065, but the latter fell ill and retreated to his kingdom.

== Conquest ==
Al-Mamun of Toledo, the Dhunnunid emir, conquered Valencia in the same year, absorbing the Taifa territories and adding them to his kingdom, he deposed his son-in-law Abd al-Malik ibn Abd al-Aziz al-Muzaffar, in a time the Taifa of Toledo reached a notable period of prosperity and expansion.

== Aftermath ==
Dhunnunids ruled Valencia until it became independent in 1075 after the death of al-Mamun of Toledo, however the city submitted again to his son Yahya al-Qadir in 1085-1086 supported by Alfonso VI of León and Castile troops led by Álvar Fáñez.
