= Amirids =

Arab dynasties

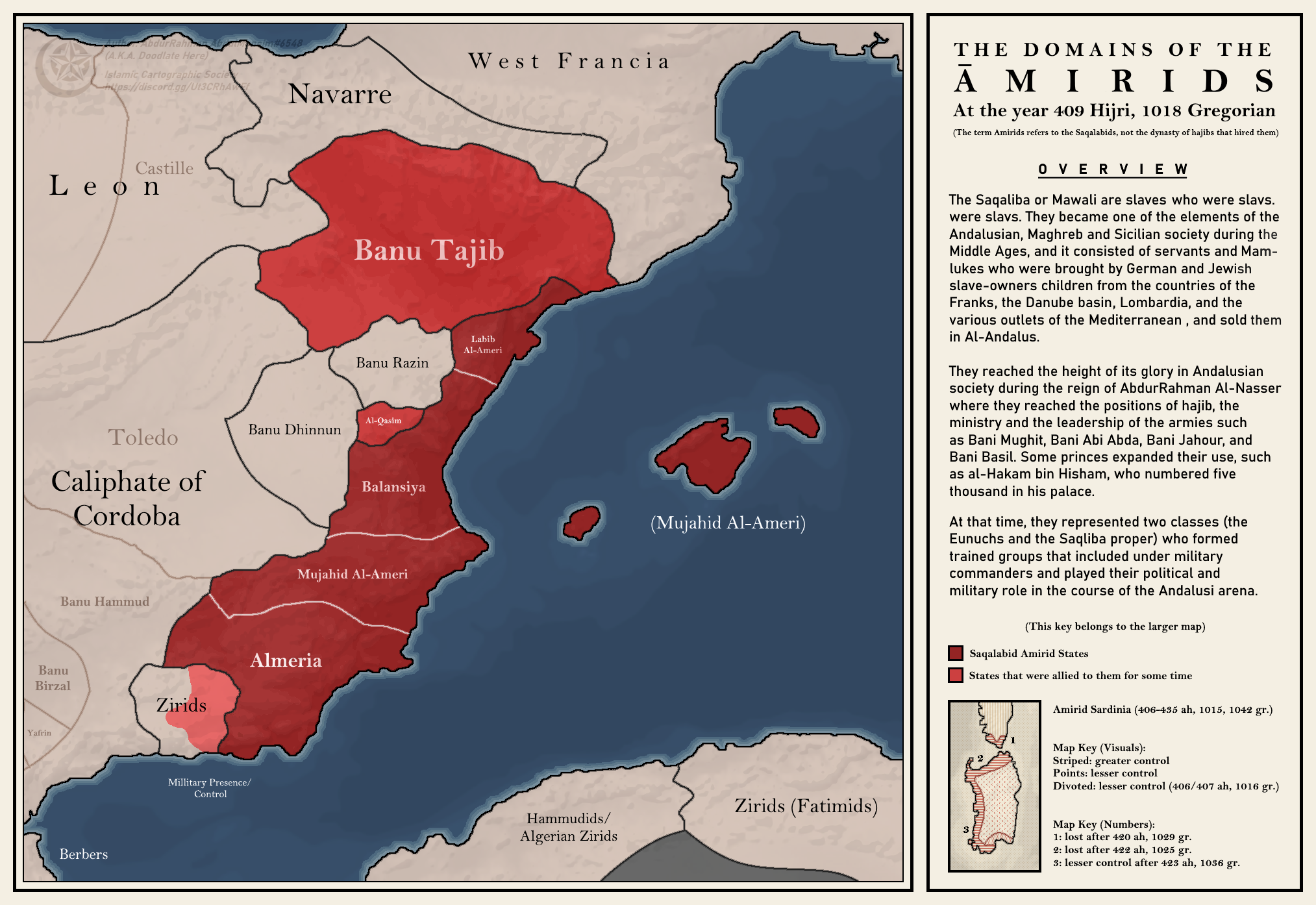
A map showing the extent of the Amirid-affiliated Saqalabid alliance in 1018 (409 AH).

The ʿĀmirids (Arabic: العامريون or Banū ʿĀmir بنو عامر) were the descendants and Ṣaqlabī (Slavic) clients of the house of the ḥājib ʿĀmir Muḥammad al-Manṣūr, the de facto ruler of the Umayyad caliphate of Córdoba from 976 until 1002. A series of ʿĀmirid dictators were the powers behind the caliphal throne during the long reign of Hishām II. Four ʿĀmirid dynasties were established during the period of taifas (petty kingdoms) that followed the collapse of the caliphate: Valencia, Dénia, Almería and Tortosa.

== Ḥājibs ==
The following list is derived from Catlos 2018, p. 435.

- Muḥammad ibn Abi ʿĀmir al-Manṣūr: 981–1002
- ʿAbd al-Malik al-Muẓaffar, son of prec.: 1002–1008
- ʿAbd al-Raḥmān Sanchuelo, brother of prec.: 1008–1009

== Ṣaqlabī dynasties ==
=== Valencia ===
The following list is derived from Bosworth 1996, p. 19.

- Mubārak and Muẓaffar: 1010/11–1017/18
  to Tortosa: 1017/18–1020/21
- ʿAbd al-ʿAzīz ibn ʿAbd al-Raḥmān ibn Abī ʿĀmir al-Manṣūr, son of Sanchuelo: 1020/21–1060
- ʿAbd al-Malik ibn ʿAbd al-ʿAzīz Niẓām al-Dawla al-Muẓaffar, son of prec.: 1060–1065
  to the Dhuʾl-Nūnids: 1065–1075
- Abū Bakr ibn ʿAbd al-ʿAzīz al-Manṣūr, brother of prec.: 1075–1085
- ʿUthmān ibn Abī Bakr al-Qāḍī, son of prec.: 1085
  to the Dhuʾl-Nūnids

=== Dénia ===
The following list is derived from Bosworth 1996, p. 17, who calls them the Banū Mujāhid. Mujāhid was a member of Muḥammad ibn Abi ʿĀmir's household.

- Mujāhid ibn ʿAbd Allāh al-ʿĀmiri al-Muwaffaq: c.1012–1045
- ʿAlī ibn Mujāhid Iqbāl al-Dawla: 1045–1076
  to the Hūdids

=== Almería ===
The following list is derived from Bosworth 1996, p. 17.

- Khayrān al-Ṣaqlabī: c.1013–1028
- Zuhayr al-Ṣaqlabī: 1028–1038
  to Valencia: 1038–1042
  to the Banū Ṣumādiḥ

=== Tortosa ===
The following list is derived from Makki 1994, p. 59.

- Labīb al-Ṣaqlabī: 1021–1036
- Muqātil al-Ṣaqlabī: 1036–c.1046
- Nabil: c.1046–c.1060
  to the Hūdids

== Sources ==
- Bosworth, C. E. (1996). The New Islamic Dynasties: A Chronological and Genealogical Manual. Edinburgh University Press.
- Catlos, Brian A. (2018). Kingdoms of Faith: A New History of Islamic Spain. Hurst and Co.
- Makki, Mahmoud (1994). "The Political History of al-Andalus (92/711–897/1492)". In Salma Khadra Jayyusi (ed.). The Legacy of Muslim Spain. Brill. pp. 3–87.
- Seybold, C. F. (1960). "ʿĀmirids". In Gibb, H. A. R.; Kramers, J. H.; Lévi-Provençal, E.; Schacht, J.; Lewis, B. & Pellat, Ch. (eds.). The Encyclopaedia of Islam, Second Edition. Volume I: A–B. Leiden: E. J. Brill. p. 446. OCLC 495469456.
