= Battle of Paterna =

Military conflict

- Part of the Reconquista
- Map of the Taifa of Valencia.
Date	1065
Location	Paterna, Province of Valencia, Spain
Result	Leonese victory

Belligerents
Kingdom of León	Taifa of Valencia

Commanders and leaders
Ferdinand I of León and Castile	Abd al-Malik ibn Abd al-Aziz al-Muẓaffar

The Battle of Paterna (Paterna, 1065) took place between the troops of the Kingdom of León, under the command of Ferdinand I of León and Castile, and those of the Taifa of Valencia, commanded by Abd al-Malik ibn Abd al-Aziz al-Muẓaffar. The battle occurred at the same time as the Siege of Valencia, resulted in a victory for the Kingdom of León.

== Historical context ==
In 1063, Fernando I of Leon sent his son, the infante Sancho to the aid of his vassal, Ahmad al-Muqtadir, king of the Taifa of Zaragoza when his city of Graus was being besieged by the forces of Ramiro I of Aragon. Consequently, Ramiro, who was Fernando's brother, would be defeated and killed.

In the aftermath of that battle, there ensued a mass slaughter of Christians. To appease public support, Ahmad al-Muqtadir stopped paying his vassal tribute to the Kingdom of León. King Fernando responded in 1065 by launching an expedition into the valley of the Ebro River, devastating the land and defeating al-Muqtadir, once again forcing him into a vassal state.

The expedition continued on towards the Taifa of Valencia, governed by Abd al-Malik ibn Abd al-Aziz al-Muẓaffar, with the intent on also turning that city into a vassal state.

== The battle ==
After besieging the city, Ferdinand I found the city's defenses to be extremely resilient and determined that it would be impossible to take them by an assault. The king therefore decided to call for a general retreat from the city. The Muslim defenders of Valencia exited the city and began to harass the retreat of the Leonese forces. At Paterna, approximately five kilometers from Valencia on the left bank of the Turia, the Leonese troops set an ambush for the pursuing forces. The Valencian attackers were surprised and wiped out almost to a man. It was said that Abd al-Malik only escaped due to the speed of his horse.

The poet Abu Ishaq al-Tarasuní related the occurrences of the battle in the following verses translated from Spanish:

"The Christians were clad in bright armour, but ye were arrayed in silken robes of various colours.

Partana is the spot where your valour and their cowardice became once more manifest."

Se habían puesto las cotas de malla de hierro mientras vosotros vestíais túnicas de seda cada cual más bella,... que feos resultaban ellos y qué hermosos vosotros si no hubiera sido por lo que pasó en Paterna.

== Aftermath ==
After the battle, King Ferdinand I once again resumed the siege of Valencia. Later during the siege, Ferdinand became ill and once again ordered a retreat back to León where he died on December 27 of the same year, 1065.

== See also ==
- Ferdinand I of León and Castile
- Reconquista
