= Mujahid al-Amiri =

Andalusian politician

Mujāhid al-ʿĀmirī

Emir of Taifa of Dénia
- Reign: Taifa of Dénia: 1009 – 436 AH (1044/1045 CE)
- Predecessor: Abd al-Rahman Sanchuelo; Caliphate of Córdoba
- Successor: 'Ali Iqbal ad-Dawla

Emir of Taifa of Valencia
- Reign: Taifa of Valencia: 410 AH (1019/1020 CE) – 411 AH (1020/1021 CE)
- Predecessor: Labib al-Saqlabi
- Successor: Abd al-Aziz al-Mansur
- Died: 436 AH (1044/1045 CE)
- Religion: Islam

Abu ʾl-Jaysh Mujāhid ibn ʿAbd Allāh al-ʿĀmirī, surnamed al-Muwaffaḳ (died AD 1044/5 [AH 436]), was the ruler of Dénia and the Balearic Islands from late 1014 (early AH 405) until his death. With the exception of his early and disastrous invasion of Sardinia, his reign was mostly peaceful. His court became a centre of scholarship and literary production and he himself wrote a book about poetry (now lost).

== Origins and rise ==
Mujāhid was a ṣaḳlabī, a slave of Slavic origin. His patronymic, Ibn ʿAbd Allāh, does not refer to his actual father. His mother was a captured Christian. He was purchased and converted to Islam by the ḥājib al-Manṣūr, who also had him educated. He may have served as governor of Dénia under al-Manṣūr's sons after 1002. After the death of al-Manṣūr's second son, Sanchuelo, in March 1009, he took control of Dénia. Within a few years he had set up his own rival puppet caliph, al-Muʿayṭī.

== Sardinian expeditions ==
In 1015 (AH 406), Mujāhid launched an expedition to conquer the island of Sardinia in the name of the caliph al-Muʿayṭī. He landed with 120 ships and occupied the southern coastal plain, but was defeated by Pisan and Genoese forces. The following year he returned with a large force of cavalry, defeated the army of the judge of Cagliari and fortified the conquered area. He even sent a force to attack Luni on the Italian coast. The chronicler Thietmar of Merseburg wrote that he sent a sack of chestnuts to the pope to illustrate the number of Muslim soldiers he would unleash on Christendom, but that Benedict VIII sent back a sack of millet representing the number of Christian soldiers that would meet them.

In May 1016, the people returned to Sardinia. Mujāhid, facing mutiny among his men, fled by sea. His fleet was devastated in a storm and the remaining ships were picked off by the Pisan and Genoese fleets. His mother and his son and eventual successor ʿAlī were captured, but Mujāhid made it back to Dénia. ʿAlī remained a prisoner for many years.

During Mujāhid's absence in Sardinia and probably informed of his difficulties, al-Muʿayṭī tried to seize actual authority in Dénia for himself. Following his return, Mujāhid sent the caliph into exile in Africa.

== Rule in Dénia ==
Mujāhid's rule in Dénia following the dismissal of al-Muʿayṭī is not well recorded. Unusually, few coins of his survive and none in his name that can be dated to between the years AH 407 (1016–17) and 434 (1042–43). Only the years 406 (1015–16) and 435 (1043–44) at the beginning and end of his reign are attested in the surviving dated coinage. He minted dirhams at a mint named "Elota" that remains unidentified.

In AH 410 (1019–20), Mujāhid became co-ruler of the taifa of Valencia alongside Labīb al-Fatā al-Ṣaqlabī. This arrangement only lasted until AH 411 (1020–21), when Labīb was forced to leave Valencia and return to Tortosa. Soon after this, Mujāhid was replaced by ʿAbd al-ʿAzīz ibn Abī ʿĀmir as the ruler of Valencia.

In 1033, Abu ʾl-Ḳāsim, the ruler of Seville, put forward an impostor claiming he was the caliph Hishām II, who had actually died in 1013. Mujāhid accepted the nominal authority of the fake Hishām II, probably as part of a series of marital alliances with the Abbadid dynasty ruling Seville.

The peace of his reign was broken only towards the end of his life, when he temporarily occupied Murcia and also became preoccupied by a dispute with his younger son, Ḥasan. He was succeeded by ʿAlī, who continued to make the court of Dénia a centre of culture.

== Patronage of scholarship ==
Mujāhid was a patron of theological and literary studies, especially of qirāʾāt (recitation). His interest in this last practice may have stemmed from his name, since one of the most influential students of qirāʾāt was Ibn Mujāhid (died 936).

Ibn Gharsiya and Ibn Burd al-Aṣghar are known to have composed works at Mujāhid's court. Ibn Gharsiya's famous risāla (treatise) on the shuʿūbiyya (non-Arab nations), criticising Arab ascendancy in Spain and praising non-Arabs, like Berbers and Slavs, was written there. Ibn Burd dedicated his Risālat al-Sayf wa ʾl-ḳalam to Mujāhid and is known to have composed other works at Dénia and elsewhere under Mujāhid's patronage. The polymath Ibn Ḥazm and the jurist Ibn ʿAbd al-Barr are also known spent time at his court.

Mujāhid himself wrote a now lost work on ʿarūḍ (Arabic metre).

Preceded by Sanchuelo	Emir of Denia; 1009–1018	Succeeded by 'Ali Iqbal ad-Dawla
Preceded by Labib al-Saqlabi	Emir of Valencia; 1019–1021	Succeeded by Abd al-Aziz al-Mansur
