= Saqaliba =

Slavic and European slaves in the Arab world

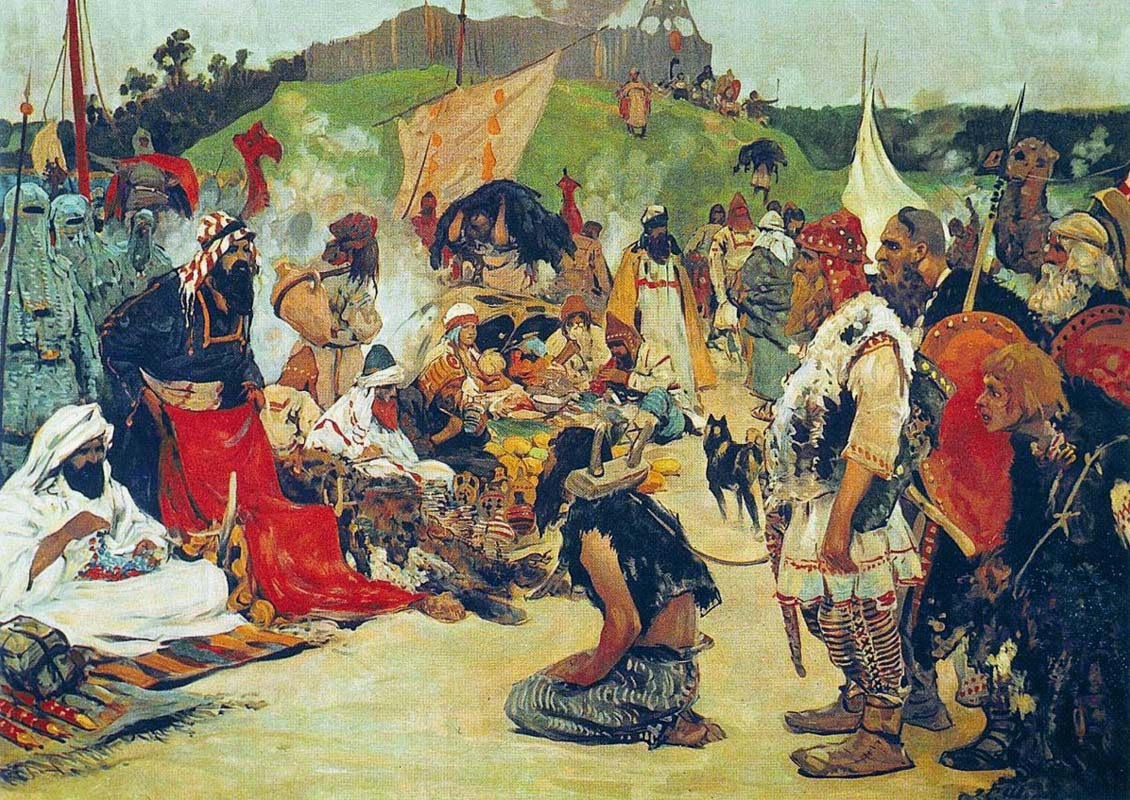
The Rus trading slaves with the Khazars: Trade in the East Slavic Camp by Sergei Ivanov (1913). Many saqaliba slaves came from Europe to the Abbasid Caliphate by the Volga trade route from Eastern Europe via the Khazars and the Caspian Sea.

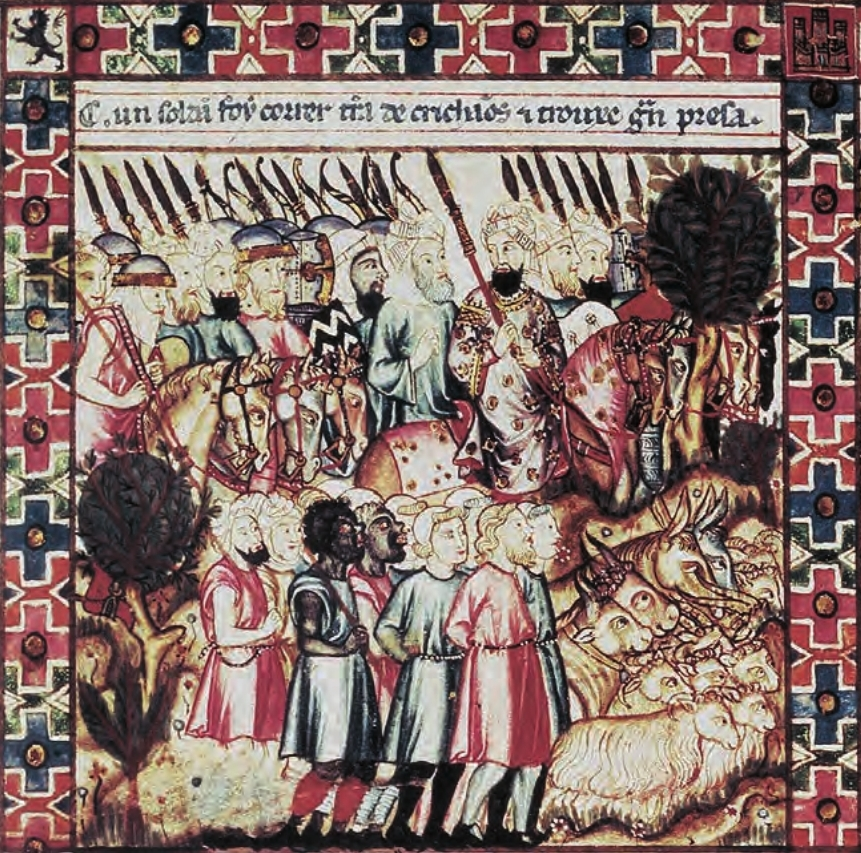
Slavic and Black slaves in Córdoba; illustration from the Cantigas de Santa Maria

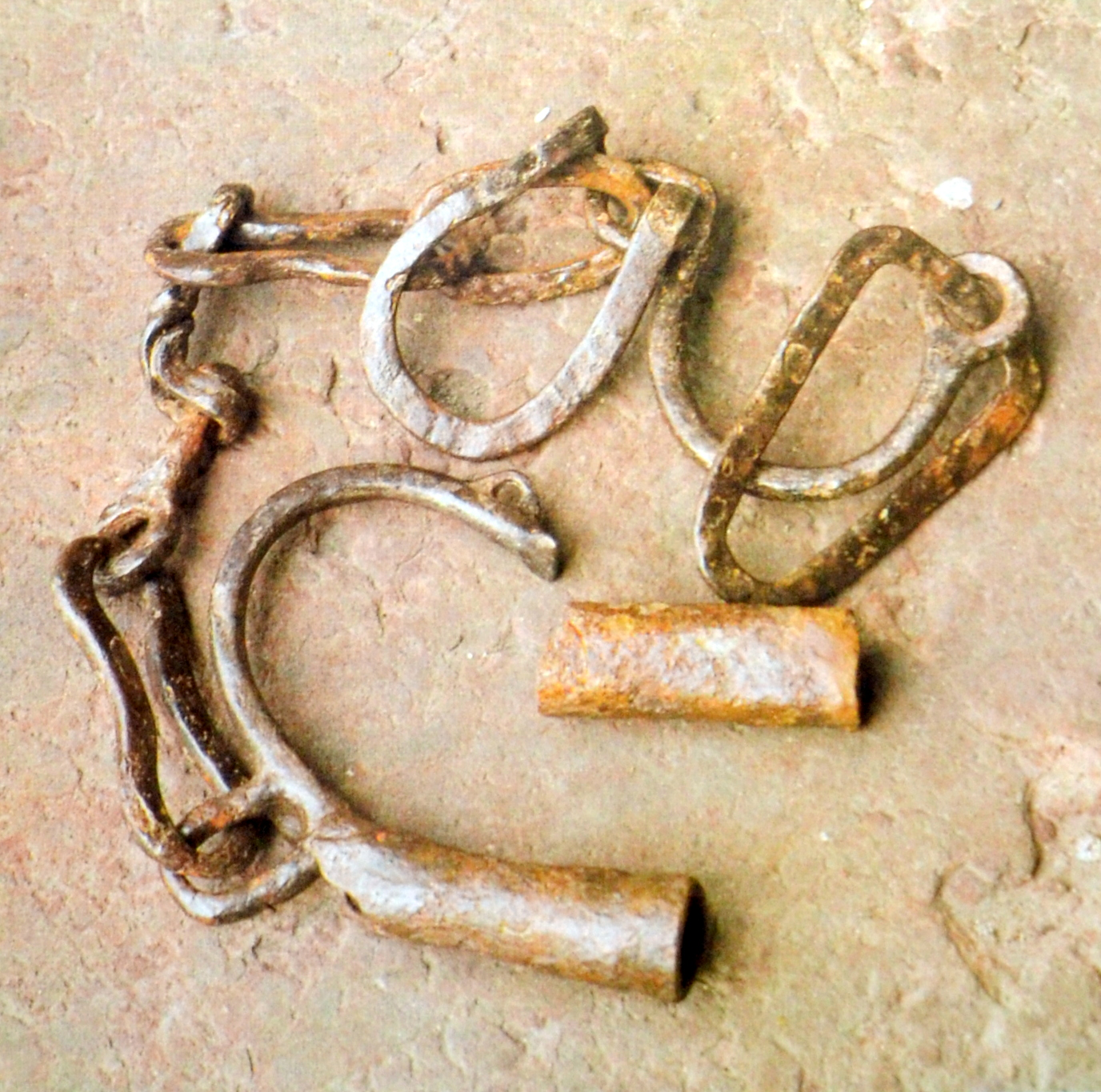
Iron restraints, 11th or 12th century, from Neu Niekohr

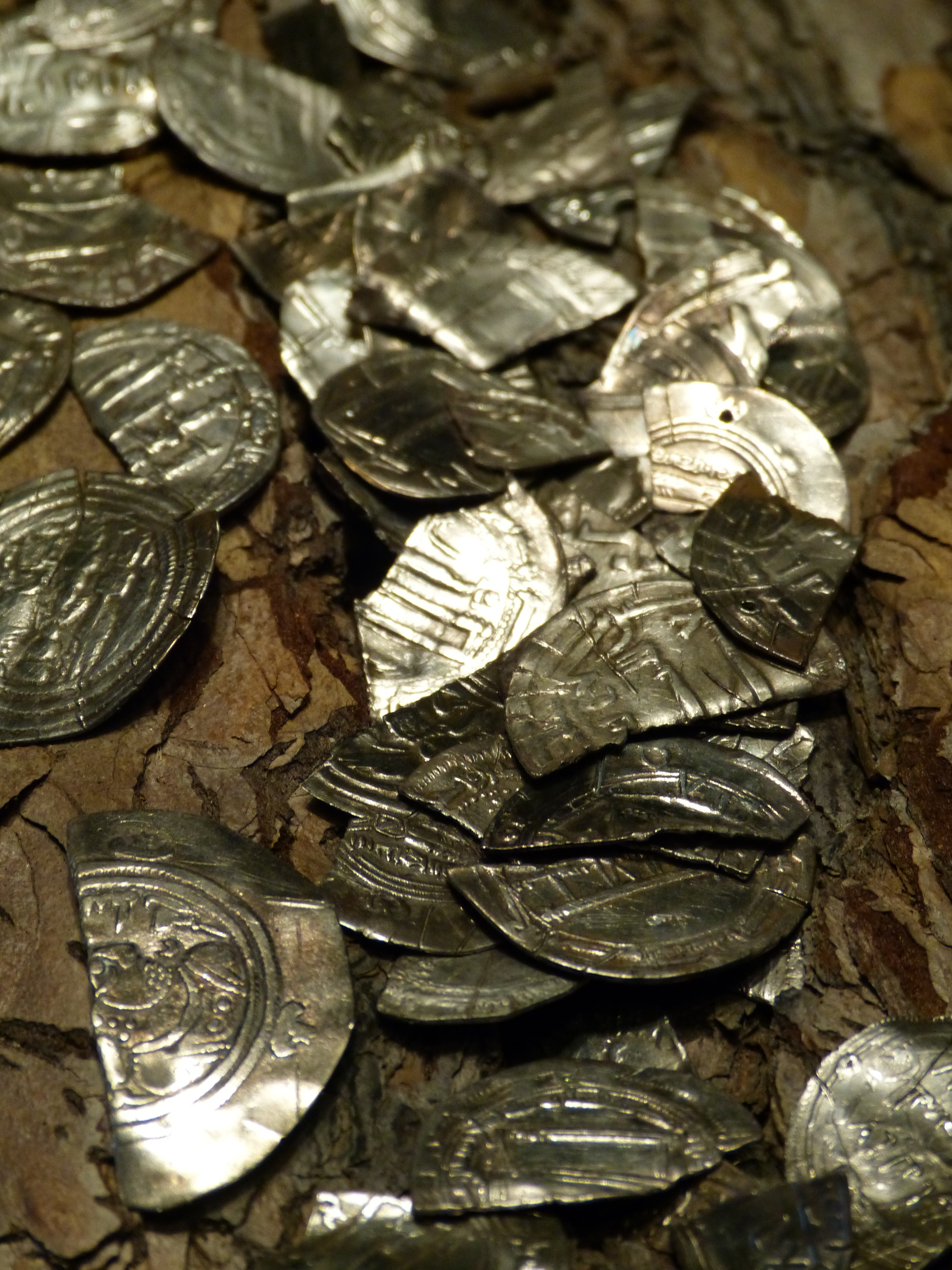
Hoard of Islamic silver coins c. 820 discovered at Anklam, West Pomerania

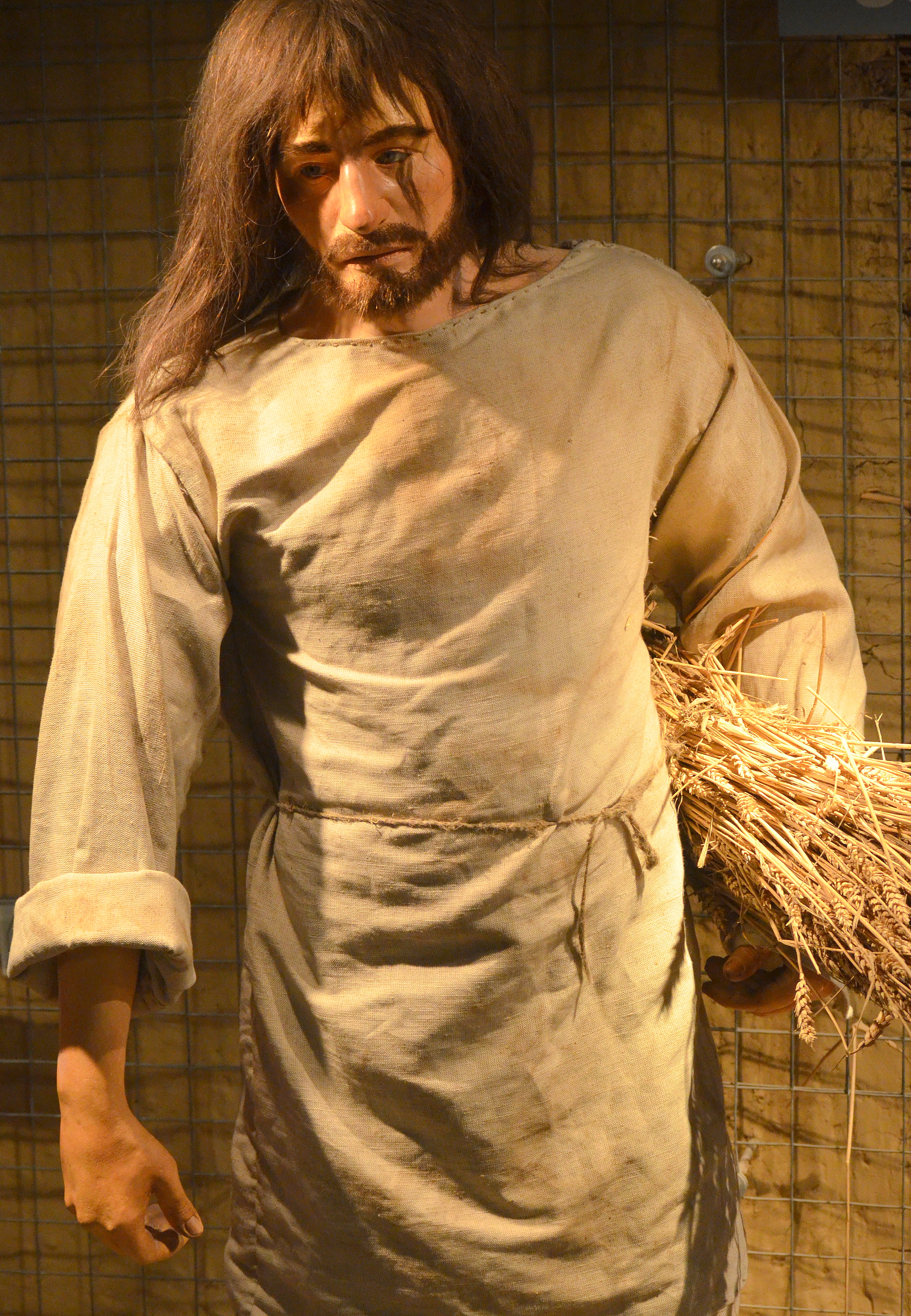
Slav, c. 800 BCE, Kraków

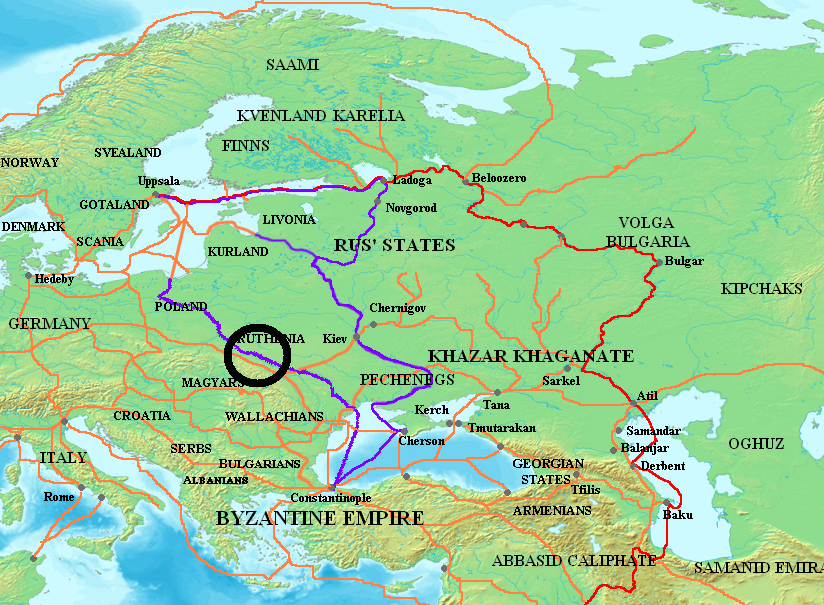
Grody czerwienskie (Czerwień Cities or Cherven Gords) szlaki

Saqaliba (Arabic: صقالبة, romanized: ṣaqāliba, singular Arabic: صقلبي, romanized: ṣaqlabī) (Note: From Greek, Σκλάβοι (Sclavi) alternates with Σκλαβηγοι (Sclavini), came the Arabic Saqlab (plural Saqāliba) in the seventh century. The semantic shift to 'slave' is a later West European development.) is a term used in medieval Arabic sources to refer to Slavs, and other peoples of Central, Southern, and Eastern Europe. The term originates from the Medieval Greek slavos/sklavenos (Slav), which in Hispano-Arabic came to designate Slavic slaves.

The word was often used to refer specifically to Slavic slaves, but it could also refer more broadly to various other ethnicities of Eastern Europe traded by the Arab traders, as well as all European slaves in some Muslim regions like Spain and Portugal including those abducted from raids on Christian kingdoms of Spain and Portugal. According to Sudár and B. Szabó, the word Saqaliba meant 'forest dweller', regardless of ethnicity.

There were several major routes for the trading of Slavic slaves into the Arab world: through Central Asia (Mongols, Tatars, Khazars, etc.) for the East Slavs; through the Balkans for the South Slavs; through Central and Western Europe for the West Slavs and to al-Andalus. The Volga trade route and other European routes, according to Ibrahim ibn Jakub (10th century), were serviced by Radanite Jewish merchants. Theophanes mentions that the Umayyad caliph Mu'awiya I settled a whole army of 5,000 Slavic mercenaries in Syria who had defected from the Byzantine side in the 660s. After the battle of Sebastopolis in 692, Neboulos, the archon of the Slavic corps in the Byzantine army, and 30,000 of his men were settled by the Umayyads in the region of Syria.

In the Arab world, the Saqaliba served or were forced to serve in a multitude of ways: as servants, harem concubines, eunuchs, craftsmen, mercenaries, slave soldiers, and as Caliph's guards. In Iberia, Morocco, Damascus and Sicily, their military role may be compared with that of mamluks in the Ottoman Empire. In al-Andalus, Slavic eunuchs were so popular and widely distributed that they became synonymous with the term Saqāliba, though not all Saqaliba were eunuchs. Some Saqāliba became rulers of taifas (principalities) in Iberia after the collapse of the Caliphate of Cordoba in 1031. For example, Mujāhid al-ʿĀmirī organized the Saqaliba in Dénia to rebel, seize control of the city, and establish the Taifa of Dénia (1010–1227), which extended its reach as far as the island of Majorca.

== Etymology ==
The Arabic term ṣaqāliba derives from Greek Sklavoi and Sklavenoi (Σκλάβοι, Σκλαβηνοί), the Slavic ethnonym (used for the Sclaveni), entering Arabic usage in the 7th century. Due to the multitude of Slavic slaves, the term "slave" replaced Latin servus. The term was usually used for the Slavic peoples of central and eastern Europe. It was variously used for Slavic peoples and countries in the 10th century; Persian polymath Abu Zayd al-Balkhi (850–934) described three main centers of the Saqaliba: Kuyaba, Slawiya, and Artania, while traveller Ibrahim ibn Yaqub (fl. 961–62) placed the Saqāliba, Slavs, west of Bulgaria and east of other Slavs, in a mountainous land (Western Balkans), and described them as violent and aggressive.

The word was often used to refer specifically to Slavic slaves, but it was also broadly used for Eastern European slaves traded by the Arabs, as well as all European slaves in some Muslim regions like Spain and Portugal including those abducted from raids on Christian kingdoms of Spain and Portugal. According to Sudár and B. Szabó, the word Saqaliba also meant "forest dweller", regardless of ethnicity, in 10th-century Muslim usage.

== Saqaliba slave trade ==
The Volga trade route was established by the Varangians (Vikings) who settled in Northwestern Russia in the early 9th century. About 10 km (6 mi) south of the Volkhov River entry into Lake Ladoga, they established a settlement called Ladoga (Old Norse: Aldeigjuborg). It connected Northern Europe and Northwestern Russia with the Caspian Sea, via the Volga River. The Rus used this route to trade with Muslim countries on the southern shores of the Caspian Sea, sometimes penetrating as far as Baghdad. The route functioned concurrently with the Dnieper trade route, better known as the trade route from the Varangians to the Greeks, and lost its importance in the 11th century.

Saqaliba originally was used to denote Slavic people, however later it came to denote all European slaves in some Muslim regions like Spain including those abducted from raids on Christian kingdoms of Spain. The Franks started buying slaves from the Slavs and Avar Khaganate while Muslims also came across slaves in the form of mercenaries serving the Byzantine Empire and settlers in addition to among the Khazars. Most Slavic slaves were imported to the Muslim world through the border between Christian and Islamic kingdoms where castration centres were also located instead of the direct route. From there they were sent into Islamic Spain and other Muslim-ruled regions especially North Africa. The Saqaliba gained popularity in Umayyad Spain especially as warriors. After the collapse of the Umayyads, they also came to rule over many of the taifas. With the conversion of Eastern Europe, the trade declined and there isn't much textual information on Saqaliba after 11th century.

Eastern Europe was the most favoured destination for importation of slaves alongside Central Asia and Bilad as-Sudan, though Balkan and Turkic slaves from Southeastern Europe were also valued. This slave trade was controlled mostly by European slave traders. France and Venice were the routes used to send Slavic slaves to Muslim lands and Prague served as a major centre for castration of Slavic captives. The Emirate of Bari also served as an important port for this trade. Due to the Byzantine Empire and Venice blocking Arab merchants from European ports, they later started importing in slave from the Caucasus and the Caspian Sea.

The Saqaliba were also imported as eunuchs and concubines to Muslim states. The slavery of eunuchs in the Muslim world however was expensive and they thus were given as gifts by rulers. The Saqaliba eunuchs were prominent at the court of Aghlabids and later Fatimids of Ifriqiya who imported them from Spain and Portugal. The Fatimids also used other Saqaliba slaves for military purposes.

=== Central Asian route ===
Slavery in the Muslim world provided a great market for the slaves captured by the Vikings in Europe. Islamic law banned Muslims from enslaving other Muslims, and there was a big market for non-Muslim slaves on Islamic territory, where European slaves were referred to as saqaliba; these slaves were likely both pagan Slavic, Finnic and Baltic Eastern Europeans as well as Christian Europeans and these slaves where often transported along the Black Sea slave trade route.

People taken captive during the Viking raids across Europe could be sold to Moorish Spain via the Dublin slave trade or transported to Hedeby or Brännö in Scandinavia and from there via the Volga trade route to present day Russia, where slaves and furs were sold to Muslim merchants in exchange for Arab silver dirham and silk, which have been found in Birka, Wollin and Dublin; initially this trade route between Europe and the Abbasid Caliphate passed via the Khazar Kaghanate, but from the early 10th-century onward it went via Volga Bulgaria and from there by caravan to Khwarazm, to the Samanid slave market in Central Asia and finally via Iran to the Abbasid Caliphate. This was one of the major routes of the Viking slave trade, alongside the Black Sea slave trade.

The slave trade between the Vikings and the Muslims in Central Asia are known to have functioned from at least between 786 and 1009, as big quantities of silver coins from the Samanid Empire has been found in Scandinavia from these years, and people taken captive by the Vikings during their raids in Europe were likely sold in Islamic Central Asia, a slave trade which was so lucrative that it may have contributed to the Viking raids across Europe.

=== Balkan slave trade ===
The Balkan slave trade went by route from the Balkans via Venetian slave traders across the Adriatic and the Aegean Seas to the Islamic Middle East, from the 7th-century until the Ottoman conquest of the Balkans in the 15th century.

Until the 6th and 7th century, the Balkans belonged to the Byzantine Empire, but was split by invasions of the Avars, Slavic tribes and other peoples. The new peoples populating the Balkans did not initially create any centralized state, which created a situation of permanent political instability on the Balkans. The various tribes conducted warfare against each other and took war captives. Due to the lack of a centralized state to negotiate for ransom, a habit formed in which war captives from the tribal wars on the Balkans were often sold to merchants from the Republic of Venice at the Adriatic coast. This developed in to a major slave trade in which Venetians bought captives from the Balkans whom they sold to the Byzantine Empire and the Islamic Middle East, which contributed to the growth of Venice as a major commercial empire by the 11th century.

The slaves bought by the Venetians at the Adriatic coast were transported by the Venetians to the slave market at the Aegean Islands where the majority continued to Egypt.

=== Prague slave trade ===
In Western Europe, a major slave trade route went from Prague in Central Europe via France to Moorish al-Andalus, which was both a destination for the slaves as well as center of slave trade to the rest of the Muslim world in the Middle East. Prague in the Duchy of Bohemia, which was a recently Christianized state in the early 10th century, became a major center of the European slave trade in between the 9th and the 11th century. The revenue from the Prague slave trade has been named as one of the economic foundations of the Bohemian state, financing the armies necessary to form a centralized state, which was not uncommon for the new Christian state in Eastern Europe.

The Duchy of Bohemia was a state in a religious border zone, bordering to Pagan Slavic lands to the North, East and South East. In the Middle ages, religion was the determining factor on who was considered a legitimate target for enslavement. Christians prohibited Christians from enslaving other Christians, and Muslims prohibited Muslims from enslaving other Muslims; however, both approved of the enslavement of Pagans, who thereby became a lucrative target for slave traders. In the 9th and 10th centuries, the Slavs in Eastern Europe were still adherents of the Slavic religion, making them Pagans to the Christians and infidels to the Muslims and considered as legitimate targets for enslavement by both. Bohemia, being a religious border state close to Pagan lands, were thus in an ideal position to engage in slave trade with both Christians and Muslims, having access to a close supply of Pagan captives. The slaves were acquired through slave raids toward the Pagan Slavic lands North of Prague.

The Pagan Slavic tribes of Central and Eastern Europe were targeted for slavery by several actors in the frequent military expeditions and raids alongside their lands. During the military campaigns of Charlemagne and his successor in the 9th century, Pagan Slavs were captured and sold by the Christian Franks along the Danube-Elbe rivers, and by the mid-10th century, Prague had become a big center of the slave trade in Slavic Pagans to al-Andalus via France.

Prague was known in all Europe as a major slave trade center. The armies of the Dukes of Bohemia captured Pagan Slavs from the East in expeditions to the lands later known as Poland to supply the slave market, which brought considerable profit to the Dukes. Several sources from the 10th century mentioned how the Dukes were involved in supplying the Prague slave market and that the slaves normally came from lands corresponding to what later corresponded to Southern Poland and Western Ukraine.

The slaves sold by the Vikings via the Eastern route could be Christian Western Europeans, but the slaves provided by the Vikings to the slave route of Prague-Magdeburg-Verdun were Pagan Slavs, who in contrast to Christians were legitimate for other Christians to enslave and sell as slaves to Muslims; according to Liutprand of Cremona, these slaves were trafficked to slavery in al-Andalus via Verdun, where some of them were selected to undergo castration to become eunuchs for the Muslim slave market in al-Andalus.

Traditionally, the slave traders acquiring the slaves in Prague and transporting them to the slave market of al-Andalus are said to have been dominated by the Jewish Radhanite merchants. While Christians were not allowed to enslave Christians and Muslims not allowed to enslave Muslims, Jewish slave traders had the advantage to move freely across religious borders, and supply Muslim slaves to the Christian world and Christian slaves to the Muslim world. as well as Pagan slaves to both. Both Christians and Muslims were prohibited from performing castrations, but there was no such ban for Jews, which made it possible for them to meet the great demand for eunuchs in the Muslim world.

The slaves were transported from Prague to Al-Andalus via France. While the church discouraged the sale of Christian slaves to Muslims, the sale of Pagans to Muslims was not met with such opposition. Louis the Fair granted his permission to Jewish merchants to traffic slaves through his Kingdom provided they were non-baptized Pagans.

The most lucrative slave market was the Islamic slavery in Al-Andalus. The Arabic Caliphate of Córdoba referred to the forests of Central and Eastern Europe, which came to function as a slave source supply, as the Bilad as-Saqaliba ("land of the slaves"). The Prague slave market was a part of a big net of slave trade in European Saqaliba slaves to the Muslim world. Ibn Hawqal wrote in the 10th century:

The country [of the Saqaliba] is long and wide....Half of their country...is raided by the Khurasanis [Khorezm] who take prisoners from it, while its northern half is raided by the Andalusians who buy them in Galicia, in France, in Lombardy and in Calabria so as to make them eunuchs, and thereafter they ferry them over to Egypt and Africa. All the Saqaliba eunuchs in the world come from Andalusia....They are castrated near this country. The operation is performed by Jewish merchants.

In Islamic lands, the slave market had specific requirements. Female slaves were used for either domestic or sexual slavery as concubines. Male slaves were used for one of two categories: either for military slavery or as eunuchs. The latter category of male slaves were subjected to castration for the market. Many male slaves selected to be sold as eunuchs were subjected to castration in Verdun. The nature of the market for Saqaliba slaves meant that most Saqaliba slaves would have been prepubescent children when enslaved.

In Moorish al-Andalus, European Saqaliba-slaves were considered as exotic display objects with their light hair, skin and eye colors. White European slaves were viewed as luxury goods in Al-Andalus, where they could be sold for as much as 1,000 dinars, a substantial price.

The slaves were not always destined for the al-Andalus market; similar to Bohemia in Europe, al-Andalus was a religious border state for the Muslim world, and Saqaliba slaves were exported from there further to the Muslim world in the Middle East.

The Duchy of Bohemia and the Caliphate of Córdoba were both dependent on each other because of the from the slave trade; the Caliphate of Córdoba was dependent on enslaved bureaucrats and slave soldiers to build and manage their centralised state, while the new state of the Duchy of Bohemia built their economic prosperity in the profit earned by trading captives for slavery in the Caliphate of Córdoba.

The saqaliba slave trade from Prague to al-Andalus via France lost its religious legitimacy when the Pagan Slavs of the North started to gradually adopt Christianity from the late 10th century, which made them of bounds for Christian Bohemia to enslave and sell to Muslim al-Andalus.

Christian Europe did not approve of Christian slaves, and as Europe adopted Christianity almost entirely by the 11th century slavery died out in Western Europe North of the Alps in the 12th- and 13th-centuries.

The disintegration of the Caliphate of Córdoba in the early 11th century, which was completed by 1031, corresponded to a period of instability in the Duchy of Bohemia in parallel with the end of the slave trade between Bohemia and the Caliphate.

=== Other slave trade routes ===
During the Middle ages, Saracen pirates established themselves in bases in France, the Baleares, Southern Italy and Sicily, from which they raided the coasts of the Christian Mediterranean and exported their prisoners as Saqaliba slaves to the slave markets of the Muslim Middle East.

The Aghlabids of Ifriqiya was a base for Saracen attacks along the Spanish East coast as well as against Southern Italy from the early 9th century; they attacked Rome in 845, Comacchio in 875–876, Monte Cassino in 882–83, and established the Emirate of Bari (847–871), the Emirate of Sicily (831–1091) and a base in Garigliano (882–906), which became bases of slave trade. During the warfare between Rome and the Byzantine Empire in Southern Italy in the 9th century the Saracens made Southern Italy a supply source for a slave trade to Maghreb by the mid-9th century; the Western Emperor Louis II complained in a letter to the Byzantine Emperor that the Byzantines in Naples guided the Saracens in their raids toward South Italy and aided them in their slave trade with Italians to North Africa, an accusation noted also by the Lombard Chronicler Erchempert.

Moorish Saracen pirates from al-Andalus attacked Marseille and Arles and established a base in Camargue, Fraxinetum or La Garde-Freinet-Les Mautes (888–972), from which they made slave raids in to France; the population fled in fear of the slave raids, which made it difficult for the Frankish to secure their Southern coast, and the Saracens of Fraxinetum exported the Frankish prisoners they captured as slaves to the slave market of the Muslim Middle East. Many of the enslaved "Frankish" Saqaliba in Al-Andalus were really ethnic Visigoths and Hispano-Romans from the Hispanic March in northeastern Iberia, later to be known as the Catalan counties.

The Saracens captured the Baleares in 903, and made slave raids also from this base toward the coasts of the Christian Mediterranean and Sicily.

While the Saracen bases in France was eliminated in 972 and Italy in 1091, this did not prevent the Saracen piracy slave trade of the Mediterranean; both Almoravid dynasty (1040–1147) and the Almohad Caliphate (1121–1269) approved of the slave raiding of Saracen pirates toward non-Muslim ships in Gibraltar and the Mediterranean for the purpose of slave raiding.

== Saqaliba slave market by place ==
=== Rus and Bulgars ===
The Rus made slave raids and sold slaves to Muslim merchants. Geographer Ibn Khordadbeh (840–880) used the term Saqaliba for Eastern Slavs and called the Bulgars "kings of the Saqāliba", meaning that the ruler had held "a reservoir of potential slaves". He called the Rus "a kind of Saqaliba". Traveller Ibn Fadlan (fl. 921–22) called Almish, the ruler of Volga Bulgaria, the "King of the Saqaliba" due to his involvement in Slave trade. Fadlan visited Volga Bulgaria in 922 and noted how Rus sold slave girls, undoubtedly of Slavic origin. Apart from Slavs, the Saqaliba slaves provided by Vikings perhaps included also Scandinavian, Baltic and Finnic slaves.

=== Aghlabids and Fatimids ===
In the Aghlabid caliphate, most of the Saqaliba were Slavic slaves, captured by Franks and Germans and brought via Germany to France and Spain where traders took them to Tanger and then to Kairouan, or sold in Italy by Venetian traders, captured by Venice or Slavic pirates themselves. The Saqaliba provided to the Aghlabids thus hailed from central Europe, the Baltics and the Balkans. The Saqaliba trade is dated to the beginning of the 9th century. Ziyad ibn al-Saqlabiyya ("son of a Saqlabi woman") raised an army revolt in 822–823 when emir Ziyadat Allah I started eliminating his enemies. Most information of the Saqaliba of the Aghlabids come from the reign of Ibrahim II (875–902).

In the Fatimid caliphate in the Maghreb, the Saqaliba were a distinct group of people in the 10th century. They were slaves brought mostly from Slavic lands in East Europe. Many among them rose to prominent positions, especially Ustadh Jawdhar and Qa'id Jawhar al-Siqilli. Jawdhar became the senior administrator and most trusted confidant of the Fatimid imam-caliph.

=== al-Andalus and Maghreb ===
==== Slave trade ====
Caliphate of Córdoba in 1000

In Western Europe, a major slave trade route went from Prague in Central Europe via France to Moorish al-Andalus, which was both a destination for slaves as well as a center of slave trade to the rest of the Muslim world in the Middle East. Prague in the Duchy of Bohemia, Christianized in the early 10th century, became a major center of the European slave trade by the mid-10th century. The revenue from the Prague slave trade has been named as one of the economic foundations of the Bohemian state. Bohemia was located in a religious border zone, bordering with pagan Slavic lands to the north and east. In the Middle ages, religion was the determining factor on who was considered a legitimate target for enslavement. Christians and Muslims were prohibited from enslaving their co-religionists; however, both approved enslavement of pagans, who thereby became a legitimized and lucrative target for the slave traders, dominated by Jewish Radhanite merchants. Bohemian slave raids were conducted mainly in the Slavic lands to the north and east of Prague, such as southern Poland and western Ukraine.

In the first half of the 9th century, Byzantium competed with Arabs regarding slaves and thus blocked maritime traffic in the Mediterranean; the Arabs thus imported Slavic slaves via the Caucasus and Caspian Sea, and in the west through Raffelstetten–France–Spain. Liutprand of Cremona noted in 986 that Verdun was a center for castration of slaves sent to Spain. al-Maqdisi (946–991) mentioned saqaliba castrated in Spain and sent to Egypt. France was a slave transit to Umayyud which had large saqaliba markets. The Caliphate of Córdoba was dependent on slave soldiers.

The country [of the Saqaliba] is long and wide ... Half of their country ... is raided by the Khurasanis [Khorezm] who take prisoners from it, while its northern half is raided by the Andalusians who buy them in Galicia, in France, in Lombardy and in Calabria so as to make them eunuchs, and thereafter they ferry them over to Egypt and Africa. All the Saqaliba eunuchs in the world come from Andalusia ... They are castrated near this country. The operation is performed by Jewish merchants.

— Ibn Hawqal (10th century)

In Islamic lands, the slave market had specific requirements. Female slaves were used for either domestic or sexual slavery as concubines. Male slaves were used for one of two categories: either for military slavery or as eunuchs. The latter category of male slaves were subjected to castration for the market. Both Christians and Muslims were prohibited from performing castrations, but there was no such ban for Jews, which made it possible for them to meet the great demand for eunuchs in the Muslim world. The nature of the market for Saqaliba slaves meant that most Saqaliba slaves would have been prepubescent children when enslaved. In Moorish al-Andalus, European Saqaliba-slaves were considered as exotic display objects with their light hair, skin and eye colors. Seen as luxury goods, a White European slave could be sold for as much as 1,000 dinars, a substantial price.

The Prague slave trade to al-Andalus via France lost its religious legitimacy when the Slavs to the north gradually adopted Christianity from the late 10th century. The caliphate disintegrated in 1031, corresponding to a period of instability in Bohemia in parallel with the end of the slave trade.

== Saqalabid dynasties ==
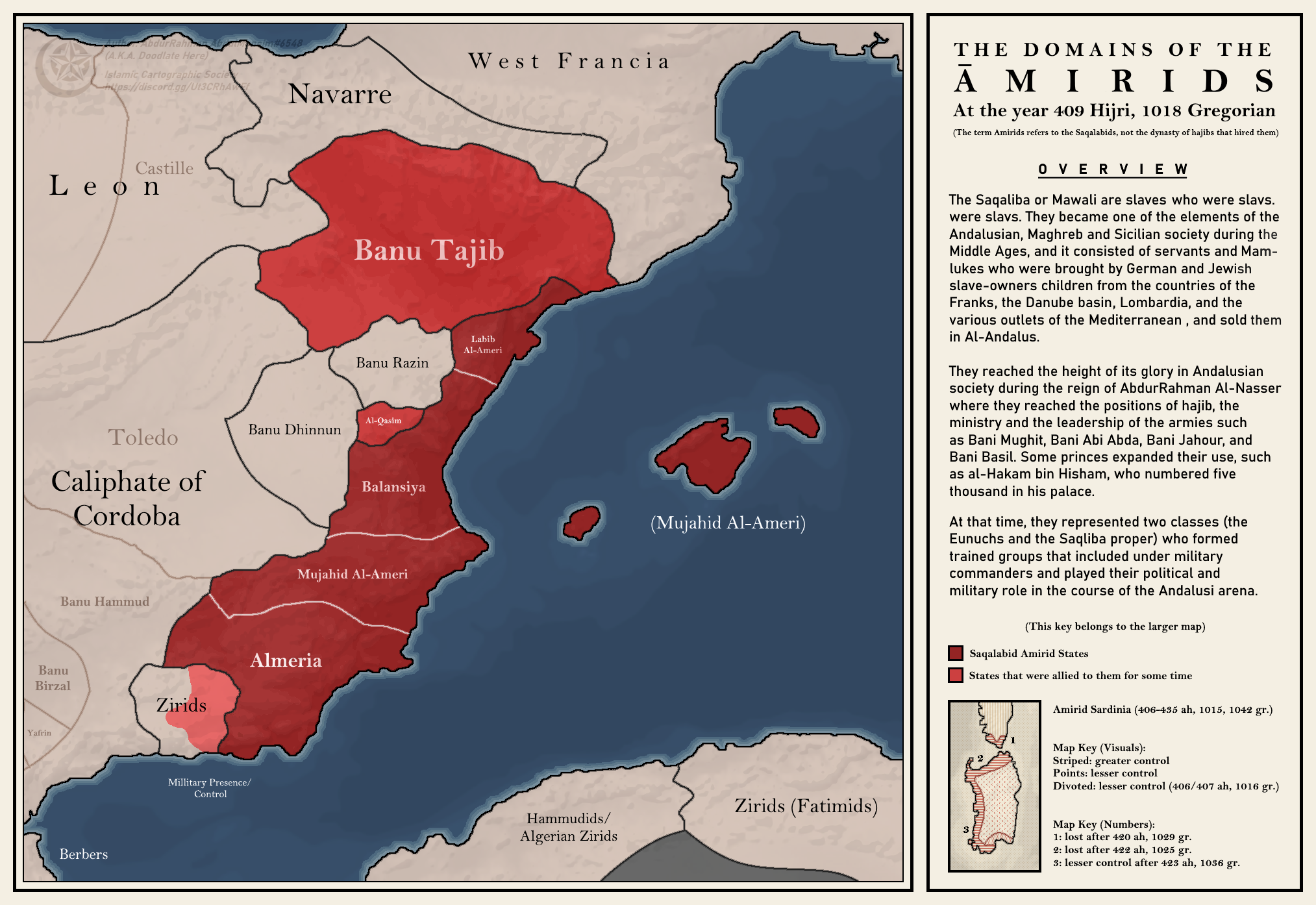
A map showing the extent of the Saqalabid alliance in 1018

=== Valencia ===
The following list is derived from Bosworth 1996, p. 19.

- Muhārak and Muẓaffar: 1010/11–1017/18
  to Tortosa: 1017/18–1020/21
- ʿAbd al-ʿAzīz ibn ʿAbd al-Raḥmān ibn Abī ʿĀmir al-Manṣūr, son of Sanchuelo: 1020/21–1060
- ʿAbd al-Malik ibn ʿAbd al-ʿAzīz Niẓām al-Dawla al-Muẓaffar, son of prec.: 1060–1065
  to the Dhuʾl-Nūnids: 1065–1075
- Abū Bakr ibn ʿAbd al-ʿAzīz al-Manṣūr, brother of prec.: 1075–1085
- ʿUthmān ibn Abī Bakr al-Qāḍī, son of prec.: 1085
  to the Dhuʾl-Nūnids

=== Dénia ===
The following list is derived from Bosworth 1996, p. 17, who calls them the Banū Mujāhid. Mujāhid was a member of Muḥammad ibn Abi ʿĀmir's household.

- Mujāhid ibn ʿAbd Allāh al-ʿĀmiri al-Muwaffaq: c.1012–1045
- ʿAlī ibn Mujāhid Iqbāl al-Dawla: 1045–1076
  to the Hūdids

=== Tortosa ===
- Labib al-Fata al-Saqlabi (Valencia 1017–1019): c. 1009–bfr. 1039/40
- Muqatil Sayf al-Milla: bfr. 1039/40–1053/4
- Ya'la: 1053/4–1057/8
- Nabil: 1057/8–1060
  - To Zaragoza: 1060–1081 or 2/3

=== Almeria ===
- 1012 Aflah.
- 1014 Khayran. Slavic slave from Cordoba Caliph palace, who dedicated his rule to the development of Almería.
- 1028 Zuhayr, also a former Slavic slave from Cordoba
- 1038 Abu Bakr al-Ramimi
- 1038 Abd al-Aziz al-Mansur, al-Mansur's grandson, King of Valencia

From 1038 to 1041 Almería belonged to the Taifa of Valencia.

== Usage ==
- Geographer Ibn Khordadbeh (840–880) claimed that the Bulgar ruling title was "King of the Saqāliba" prior to the mid-7th century, meaning that the ruler held "a reservoir of potential slaves".
- Traveller Ibn Fadlan (fl. 921–22) called the ruler of Volga Bulgaria the "King of the Saqaliba".
- Polymath Abu Zayd al-Balkhi (850–934) described three main centers of the Saqaliba: Kuyaba, Slawiya, and Artania.
- Traveller Ibrahim ibn Yaqub (fl. 961–62) placed the Saqāliba, Slavs, west of Bulgaria and east of other Slavs, in a mountainous land, and described them as violent and aggressive. It is believed that these were situated in the Western Balkans.

== See also ==
- Abbasid harem
- Amirids (Saqalabid coalition in al-Andalus)
- Devshirme
- Ghilman
- History of slavery in the Muslim world
- Janissary
- Mamluk
- Zanj
