= Ilario Cao =

Ilario Cao (Hilarius Caius) was a Sardinian ecclesiastic active in Rome during the first thirty years of the eleventh century, often retrospectively called a Cardinal. He was born in Cagliari. He urged Pope Benedict VIII to organise an expedition to free his native land from Muslim pirates, who were establishing themselves in the south of the island, based out of Cagliari. A Pisan–Genoese expedition (1016) resulted, which expelled the Muslims.

Ilario had two sons: Costantino (Constantinus) and Atanagio or Anastasio (Anastasius). The former built a hospital in Trastevere for poor Sardinians, which was destroyed in the later sack of Rome (1527). In 1068 Anastasio's son Benedetto erected a tombstone in the church of San Crisogono over his father's sepulchre bearing this inscription:

HIC SEPULTVS EST
CONSTANTINVS CAO CALARITANVS
CVM HILARO PATRE ET ANASTASIO FRATRE
QVI HOSPITALE PRO SARDINIAE PAVPERIBVS
FVNDAVIT
CVI AEDES ATTRIBVIT ET CENSVS APPLICVIT
HILARI PRECIBVS SARDINIAM
A SARACENIS
PAPA LIBERARI CVRAVIT
ANASTASIVS FVIT LITTERARVM PERITISSIMVS
PONTIFICIBVS CARVS ET PIETATE CLARVS
BENEDICTVS CAIVS ANASTASII FILIVS
POSVIT MLXVII
