= Martín Fernández de Hita =

Martín Fernández de Hita (fl. 1125–1149) was a Castilian nobleman during the reign of Alfonso VII.

Martín was the eldest son of Fernando García de Hita and his second wife, Estefania Ermengol, the daughter of Count Ermengol V of Urgell and María Pérez. As his father had acquired the lordships of Hita and Uceda during his marriage to Estefania, they passed to Martín on his death in 1125. He signed his first document at the royal court on 12 July 1128. He never became a regular courtier, however, only attending court frequently when with the king on campaign. A seal matrix found at Hita bearing the name "Martín Fernández" may be his.

Martín may have served as the vicar of his half-brother, Gutierre Fernández de Castro, in Calahorra between 1139 and 1151. He was present at the siege of Oreja in 1139. On 15 February 1143, he was present at the foundation of Valbuena Abbey by his mother.

In late January 1143, in advance of Alfonso VII's campaign against Córdoba, Martín and Muño Alfonso were placed in charge of the castle of Peñas Negras facing a Muslim fortress at Mora. When they became aware of a relief force marching to Mora, the chose to meet it on 1 August. Martín was wounded in the fighting but managed to retreat with his men, while Muño was trapped and killed.

In 1145 or 1146, Martín was one of four noblemen sent by Alfonso to force Baeza, Úbeda and Jaén to submit. The other three were the Counts Manrique Pérez de Lara, Ermengol VI of Urgell and Ponce de Cabrera. Alfonso's forces met and defeated Sayf al-Dawla at the battle of Albacete. In 1147, Martín took part in the siege of Almería. In the Poema de Almería, he is the subject of lines 244–250:

Martín, the son of Fernando, orders all the arms to be requisitioned from the houses. He will inflict severe reverses on the Moors.
Hita rejoices because he is its governor. The countenance of Martín Fernández is clear and his body is strong. He is handsome, robust and noble. He has command of these troops, and when he raises his voice, the Moors flee in terror. He has armed handsome young men with resplendent weapons.
Martín's camp resounds with a youthful tumult. Scorning death they grow bold. They enjoy war more than a friend enjoys a friend. With their banners unfurled they enter the tents of the king. They exhort the chiefs to war: "What are you doing here, idle ones?"

Following the siege, he was the acting tenente of Almería on behalf of Ponce Cabrera. Alfonso VII names him as such in a charter of 15 February 1149. Martín was present as a witness when Alfonso VII made a donation to his sister, Urraca Fernández, on 3 February 1148. The date of his death is not known.

== Bibliography ==
- Barton, Simon (1997). The Aristocracy in Twelfth-century León and Castile. Cambridge University Press.
- Lipskey, Glenn Edward (1972). The Chronicle of Alfonso the Emperor: A Translation of the Chronica Adefonsi imperatoris, with Study and Notes (PhD dissertation). Northwestern University.
- López de los Mozos, José Ramón (1992). "Un sello medieval encontrado en Hita" (PDF). Wad-al-Hayara: Revista de estudios de Guadalajara. 19: 425–431.
- Reilly, Bernard F. (1998). The Kingdom of León-Castilla Under King Alfonso VII, 1126–1157. University of Pennsylvania Press.
- Salazar Acha, Jaime de (1991). "El linaje castellano de Castro en el siglo XII: consideraciones e hipótesis sobre su origen". Anales de la Real Academia Matritense de Heráldica y Genealogía. 1: 33–68.
- Sánchez de Mora, Antonio (2018). "García de Hita, Fernando". Diccionario biográfico español. Real Academia de la Historia.
