= Abu Muhammad Abd Allah ibn Iyad =

ʿAbū Muḥammad ʿAbd Allāh ibn ʿIyād (died 21 August 1147) was the ruler (amīr) of Murcia and Valencia from 1145 until his death.

Under the Almoravids, Ibn ʿIyād was a military commander (qāʾid) based in Lleida. He led a contingent at the battle of Fraga in 1134 and was credited by Ibn al-Athīr with leading a successful cavalry charge. He was later recruited by Marwān ibn ʿAbd al-ʿAzīz, the qāḍī (judge) of Valencia to lead the resistance to the Almoravids in Játiva. In March 1145, he persuaded Marwān to accept the post of raʾīs in Valencia. In October, he seized power in Murcia. When Marwān failed to pay the jund (army), they replaced him with Ibn ʿIyād in November. He thus came into control of both Murcia and Valencia by the end of 1145.

In January 1146, Ibn ʿIyād recognized the authority of Sayf al-Dawla as sovereign, inviting him to form a government in Murcia and Valencia. According to al-Dhahabī, the arrangement was that "Ibn ʿIyād would control the army and money and Sayf al-Dawla was sultan." The former took the title mujāhid. He continued to recognize the caliphal and religious authority of the Abbasids. Al-Dhahabī also claims that Sayf al-Dawla accused Ibn ʿIyād of creating discord between him and his Christian ally, Alfonso VII of Castile. In the battle of Albacete on 5 February 1146, Sayf al-Dawla was killed by the Christians but Ibn ʿIyād escaped.

Ibn ʿIyād continued to wield power in the name of Sayf al-Dawla's son, ʿAbd al-Raḥmān. He minted coins in his name into 1146, when he switched to minting in his own name. He introduced a morabetino of high quality, containing 3.9 grams of gold, that became known after him as the ayadino. It was highly valued in the Kingdom of Aragon. From May 1146, ʿAbd Allāh ibn Faraj al-Thaghrī exercised actual power in Murcia as raʾīs. In December, Ibn ʿIyād recovered control. Ibn ʿIyād died in battle near Uclés in August 1147 and was succeeded by Ibn Mardanīsh.

== Bibliography ==
- Balbale, Abigail Krasner (2023). The Wolf King: Ibn Mardanish and the Construction of Power in al-Andalus. Cornell University Press. doi:10.1515/9781501765896.
- Bosworth, C. E. (1996). The New Islamic Dynasties: A Chronological and Genealogical Manual. Edinburgh University Press.
- Fierro, Maribel (1994). "The Qāḍī as Ruler" (PDF). Saber religioso y poder político en el Islam: Actas del Simposio Internacional (Granada, 15–18 octubre 1991). Agencia Española de Cooperación Internacional. pp. 71–116.
- Kennedy, Hugh (1996). Muslim Spain and Portugal: A Political History of al-Andalus. Routledge.
- Minnema, Anthony (2019). "A Ṭāʾifa in Exile: Sayf al-Dawla and the Survival of the Banū Hūd". Al-Masāq. 31 (1): 1–19. doi:10.1080/09503110.2018.1515518.
- Todesca, James J. (2019). "Selling Castile: Coinage, Propaganda, and Mediterranean Trade in the Age of Alfonso VIII". In Miguel Gómez; Damian Smith; Kyle C. Lincoln (eds.). King Alfonso VIII of Castile: Government, Family, and War. Fordham University Press. pp. 30–58.
- Ubieto Artur, María Isabel (1984). "Los morabedís ayadinos, circulación y cambio en el reino de Aragón según la documentación coetánea". Numisma. 34: 209–225.
