= Battle of Albacete =

1146 battle in the Iberian Peninsula

Coordinates: 38°55′0″N 1°43′0″W

The battle of Albacete (5 February 1146) was a confrontation between Sayf al-Dawla (Zafadola), emir of Murcia and Valencia, and an army of the kingdom of León-Castile. The Castilians were victorious. Sayf al-Dawla was captured in the battle and subsequently assassinated.

== Background ==
There are conflicting accounts of the circumstances that led to the battle. According to the Chronicle of the Emperor Alfonso, a Latin Christian source, Sayf al-Dawla requested assistance from the Emperor Alfonso VII of León to suppress a revolt centred on Baeza, Úbeda and Jaén. The emperor sent him troops under the command of Counts Manrique Pérez de Lara, Ermengol VI of Urgell and Ponce de Cabrera, as well as Martín Fernández de Hita.

The Arabic Muslim sources, however, portray Sayf al-Dawla as responding to Christian raiding around Xàtiva. These sources—Ibn al-Abbār's al-Ḥulla al-siyarāʾ, al-Dhahabī's Siyar aʿlām al-nubalāʾ and Ibn al-Kardabūs's Taʾrīkh al-Andalus—were written somewhat later. On the whole, the Arabic sources' explanation makes better sense of the battle's location, Albacete (al-Basīṭ). According to al-Dhahabī, Sayf al-Dawla was hesitant to give battle and accused the qāḍī Ibn ʿIyād of undermining his relations with Alfonso.

== Confrontation ==
According to both the Chronicle of the Emperor and al-Dhahabī, the battle was preceded by negotiations. The Chronicle claims that the inhabitants of the raided territory offered to submit to Sayf al-Dawla if he would defend them from the Christians. Sayf al-Dawla came with an army. He himself "entered [the Christian] camp peacefully." He demanded the Christians hand over their captives and booty and submit the issue to the emperor to settle. The counts refused, claiming "we have done just as you and the emperor have commanded us." Sayf al-Dawla threatened battle and the counts responded, "Now is the time and the hour."

According to the Chronicle, "the combat which ensued was extremely fierce." Both the Chronicle and al-Dhahabī agree that in the subsequent engagement, Sayf al-Dawla was captured and subsequently killed. Al-Dhahabī adds that Ibn ʿIyād escaped. The Chronicle specifies that Sayf al-Dawla was killed without authorization by some knights "because of their own special religious sentiments." Alfonso VII was saddened by his death and declared his own innocence.

== Historiography ==
Compared to the Muslim sources, the Chronicle of the Emperor Alfonso "strikes a tragic tone that comes closest to reality." Despite its general perspective in favour of fighting Muslims, it clearly regards the death of Sayf al-Dawla as unfortunate and unintended. It is keen to distance Alfonso and his appointed generals from the assassination.

The Muslim accounts carry no ambivalence. The story has a clear moral, either that Muslim princes who serve Christian rulers meet bad ends or that Sayf al-Dawla redeemed himself in the end by resisting. Ibn al-Abbār says that he and his soldiers who died at Albacete were martyrs.

== Bibliography ==
- Balbale, Abigail Krasner (2023). The Wolf King: Ibn Mardanish and the Construction of Power in al-Andalus. Cornell University Press. doi:10.1515/9781501765896.
- Barton, Simon (1997). The Aristocracy in Twelfth-century León and Castile. Cambridge University Press.
- Lipskey, Glenn Edward (1972). The Chronicle of Alfonso the Emperor: A Translation of the Chronica Adefonsi imperatoris, with Study and Notes (PhD dissertation). Northwestern University.
- Minnema, Anthony (2019). "A Ṭāʾifa in Exile: Sayf al-Dawla and the Survival of the Banū Hūd". Al-Masāq. 31 (1): 1–19. doi:10.1080/09503110.2018.1515518.
- Seybold, C. F. (1927). "Ibn Mardanīs̲h̲". In M. Th. Houtsma; A. J. Wensinck; T. W. Arnold; W. Heffening; É. Lévi-Provençal (eds.). Encyclopaedia of Islam. Vol. II: E–K. E. J. Brill. p. 403.
- Seybold, C. F. & Huici Miranda, A. (1960). "al-Basīṭ". In Gibb, H. A. R.; Kramers, J. H.; Lévi-Provençal, E.; Schacht, J.; Lewis, B. & Pellat, Ch. (eds.). The Encyclopaedia of Islam, Second Edition. Volume I: A–B. Leiden: E. J. Brill. p. 1082. OCLC 495469456.
