= Mubarak and Muzaffar =

- Emirs of the Taifa of Valencia
- Reign: Taifa of Valencia: 1010–1018
- Successor: Labib al-Fata al-Saqlabi
- Born: Possibly in Eastern Europe
- Died: 1018
- Dynasty: Amirids
- Religion: Islam

Mubārak al-Saqlabi and Muẓaffar al-Saqlabi were jointly the first emirs of the Taifa of Valencia between 1010 and 1018. They were brothers and Saqaliba, originally Slavic children that were captured, castrated, sold as slaves in Spain, and educated in the Islamic culture and religion. They became slaves of another slave named Mufaris who was chief of police in the palace of Almanzor in the Medina Azahara.

There are no records until 1010, when they became administrators of irrigation of Valencia and were responsible for the water supply and food supply of the city. As the result of a military coup, of which the details have been lost, they became joint rulers of Valencia in 1010. Their administration was known for collecting 120,000 dinars of taxes a month, which was an extremely large sum at the time. Mubarak died in a riding accident in 1018, and shortly thereafter Muzaffar was killed in an uprising.

They were succeeded by Labib al-Saqlabi, also a former slave, who had been governor of Tortosa between 1015 and 1016, and probably was responsible for the rebellion against Muzaffar.

Preceded by Ali ibn Hammud al-Nasir (Caliph of Cordoba)	Emirs of Valencia; 1010–1018	Succeeded by Labib al-Saqlabi
