= Labib al-Fata al-Saqlabi =

Emir of the Taifa of Tortosa
- Reign: 400 AH (1009/1010 CE)?–431 AH (1039/1040 CE)
- Predecessor: none
- Successor: Muqatil Sayf al-Milla

Emir of the Taifa of Valencia
- Reign: 410 AH (1019/1020 CE)–411 AH (1020/1021 CE)
- Predecessor: Mubarak and Muzaffar
- Successor: Mujāhid al-ʿĀmirī
- Died: 431 AH (1039/1040 CE); Tortosa
- Religion: Islam

Labib al-Fata al-Saqlabi (Arabic: لبيب الفتى الصقلبي) (or Labib of Tortosa) was the founder and first ruler of the Taifa of Tortosa from around 400 AH (1009/1010 CE) to 431 AH (1039/1040 CE). He was a Saqaliba, usually Slavic children that were captured, castrated, sold as slaves in Spain, and educated in the Islamic culture and religion.

It is possible that Labib left Cordoba after Hisham II was deposed in 400 AH (1009/1010 CE). Some time after this he took power in the city of Tortosa, but was deposed when the city was briefly taken over by the Mundhir I of the Taifa of Zaragoza. However, due to aid from the Mubarak and Muzaffar of Taifa of Valencia he was able to regain his throne. During this time, the poet Ibn Darrach al-Qastalli dedicated a composition to him.

He supported the proclamation of Abd al-Rahman IV as caliph of Cordoba in 408 AH (1017/1018 CE), but they and their caliph were defeated in the vicinity of Granada by Zawi ibn Ziri. Shortly after this Mubarak and Muzaffar died (possibly due to a rebellion instigated by Labib), and Labib became the ruler of the Taifa of Valencia.

In 410 AH (1019/1020 CE) he became co-ruler of the Taifa of Valencia alongside Mujāhid al-ʿĀmirī. This arrangement only lasted until 411 AH (1020/1021 CE), when Labib was forced to leave Valencia and return to Tortosa. Soon after this Mujahid was replaced by Abd al-Aziz ibn Ámir as the ruler of The Taifa of Valencia.

In 427 AH (1035/1036 CE), Labib declared allegiance to Hisham II (who was most likely dead after the Berbers sacking Cordoba in 1013) as a symbol of his legitimacy, after the ruler of the Taifa of Seville, Abu al-Qasim Muhammad ibn Abbad claimed he had reappeared.

It is possible that he died in Tortosa in 431 AH (1039/1040 CE), but it is uncertain whether he was deposed or named a successor, since the only evidence found has been that after this date coinage was issued by his successor, Muqatil Sayf al-Milla.
