= Abd al-Malik ibn Abd al-Aziz al-Muzaffar =

- Emir of the Taifa of Valencia

Taifa of Valencia
- Reign: 1061–1065
- Predecessor: Abd al-Aziz al-Mansur
- Successor: none
- Father: Abd al-Aziz al-Mansur
- Religion: Islam

Abd al-Malik ibn Abd al-Aziz al-Muzaffar was the king of the Taifa of Valencia between 1061 and 1065. He was the son of Abd al-Aziz al-Mansur.

In the spring of 1065, the Taifa was attacked by Fernando I of Leon, who besieged the city of Valencia. With the assistance of his father-in-law, the Emir al-Mamun of Toledo, he was able to break the siege and pursued retreating the forces of Fernado I. However, during the Battle of Paterna his forces suffered a serious defeat, and as a result his father in-law convinced the Valencia prime minister Ibn Rawbax to dethrone and incorporate into the Taifa of Toledo, with Ibn Rawbax as governor.

Preceded by Abd al-Aziz al-Mansur	Emir of Valencia; 1061–1065	Succeeded by none
