= Abd al-Aziz al-Mansur =

Abd-al-Aziz al-Mansur
- Emir of the Taifa of Valencia

Taifa of Valencia
- Reign: 1021 to 1061
- Predecessor: Mujāhid al-ʿĀmirī
- Successor: Abd al-Malik ibn Abd al-Aziz al-Muẓaffar

Taifa of Almeria
- Reign: 1038 to 1044
- Born: 1005
- Died: 1061 (aged 55–56)
- Father: Abd al-Rahman Sanchuelo
- Religion: Islam

Abd-al-Aziz al-Mansur was the king of the Taifa of Valencia between 1021 and 1061. He was the son of Abd al-Rahman Sanchuelo. He was two years old at the time of his father's violent death and was taken for safekeeping to Zaragoza, where he grew up. At the age of fifteen, with the help of Zaragoza, a coup installed him as king of Valencia.

He was responsible for the construction of the Arab wall of the city of Valencia, of which some of the sections still stand today. According to the geographer al-Urdi, the wall had seven gates with semi-circular towers.

Preceded by Mujāhid al-ʿĀmirī	Emir of Valencia; 1021–1061	Succeeded by Abd al-Malik ibn Abd al-Aziz al-Muẓaffar
Preceded by Abu Bakr al-Ramimi	Emir of Almeria; 1038–1044	Succeeded by Ma'n ben Muhammad ben Sumadih
