= Abd al-Rahman Sanchuelo =

Caliphate of Córdoba chief minister (983-1009)

Abd al-Rahman al-Mahdi
- Born: 983; Córdoba
- Died: March 4, 1009 (aged 25–26)
- Other name: Sanchol
- Occupation: chief minister of the Caliphate of Córdoba

Abd al-Rahman al-Mahdi (983 – 4 March 1009), nicknamed Sanchol ('little Sancho', Sanchuelo to later historians), was the ʿĀmirid hajib (chief minister) of the Caliphate of Córdoba under Caliph Hisham II from October 1008, at a time when actual power in the caliphate was vested in the hajib. The Caliph nominated him as heir a month later, but he was deposed by a coup the following February. He was killed some weeks later during a vain attempt to regain power. Though an unpopular and highly flawed leader, his deposition led to the disintegration of the caliphate.

== Youth ==
Sanchuelo was born in Córdoba, the son of the hajib Almanzor and a converted Christian named Abda. She was a daughter of Sancho II of Pamplona, likely originally named Urraca or Sancha. He was nicknamed Sanchol (Arabic: شنجول, romanized: šanjūl), the diminutive of Sancho, after his Christian grandfather. His father had elevated the role of hajib, once an advisory role, to become the de facto leader of the Córdoba caliphate, setting up his own court, taking charge of the armies and sequestering Caliph Hisham II from the public in near-captivity. Sanchuelo would have been raised at his father's residence of az-Zahira on the outskirts of Córdoba. At the age of about nine in September 992 he rode out to receive the visit of his grandfather Sancho II, and escort him along the troop-lined road to his father at the az-Zahira court.

His father took active means to toughen him and his elder brother as warriors. About 995, troops of the Kingdom of Pamplona attacked Calatayud and killed the governor's brother. In revenge Almanzor ordered the beheading of 50 Pamplonan captives who had been taken at Uncastillo some time earlier. According to Ibn Darraj, at Almanzor's direction, Sanchuelo was tasked with personally beheading one of the captives, who was his uncle. Then at the age of 14 in 997, Sanchuelo took part in his father's campaign against Santiago de Compostela, and Ibn Darraj composed a poem celebrating Sanchuelo's acts as well as a second dedicated to the actions of both Sanchuelo and his brother. In the Battle of Cervera in 1000, when the situation looked dire, his father sent him to the front lines to fight (as reported by historian Ibn Hayyan, whose father was present).

== Succession as hajib ==
In 1002, Almanzor died while being taken to Medinaceli. On his death bed, he instructed his favorite son Abd al-Malik al-Muzaffar to leave Abd al-Rahman in charge of the local army, while he was to speed to Caliph Hisham II in Córdoba to carry news of his father's death and be given the reigns of the caliphate as successor to his father before any resistance might arise. This the Caliph did, in spite of popular protest demanding direct rule by Hisham. The new hajib had to put these protests down with force.

Al-Muzaffar spent his short tenure fighting successive campaigns to try to bring the Christian states of the north to submission. During one of these, at the surrender of the fortress of San Martín in 1007, Sanchuelo was given charge of the hostages by his brother, with orders to separate out all the men and put them to the blade, while enslaving the women and children among the troops. Al-Muzaffar became ill during 1008 and had to stop a campaign against Castile, as he faced rebellions from two rivals. He died either on 8 October or about 22 October 1008.

Following Al-Muzaffar's death, Sanchuelo first garnered the fealty of his brother's retainers, pending the Caliph's approval of his succession as hajib, which he subsequently received. Just as they had done following the death of Almanzor, the population of Córdoba responded angrily to the continued domination of the ʿĀmirids over the sequestered caliph, with many also coming to believe that Abd al-Rahman had poisoned his brother.

Abd al-Rahman's rule was extremely unpopular, with a number of chroniclers decrying his debauchery, alcohol consumption and general foolishness. He personified all of the built-up animosity of Córdoba's citizens over his family's sequestration of the caliph. This public mood he exacerbated by boldly and recklessly seeking to be named the official successor to the caliphate. He recruited the qadi of Córdoba and the official secretary to persuade Hisham II to make a proclamation to that effect. In spite of initial scruples, Hisham relented and issued a formal proclamation naming Abd al-Rahman as his heir in November 1008. The combination of his irreligiousness and incompetence, along with the prospect of the caliphate passing out of the hands of the north-Arab Umayyad dynasty and instead being vested in a representative of the Yemeni/south-Arab Ma'afiries who was also a grandson of a hated Pamplona king, led Córdoba's middle class and the general populace to oppose his status as crown prince, though he retained the support of the well paid mostly Berber and Slav army.

== Deposition and death ==
In the midst of this discontent, and in spite of having been warned by his son not to leave Córdoba because of a coup brewing among the Umayyad descendants of Abd al-Rahman III, Sanchuelo nonetheless decided to launch a winter campaign in order to punish the fractious Christian kingdoms to the north, specifically León under their boy-king Alfonso V. Leaving his cousin Ibn Asqaleya in charge of the capital, he departed with his army in mid-January, only for his troops to become mired in snow, mud and floodwaters as Alfonso refused to give battle. As a result, the caliphate army was forced to withdraw to Toledo. There Sanchuelo learned that on 15 February 1009, a group of 30 armed men led by Muhammad ibn Hisham ibn 'Abd al-Jabbar, Abd al-Rahman III's great-grandson, had overwhelmed the palace guard and killed the governor, Ibn Asqaleya. This action encouraged a larger uprising of the general populace that resulted in the abdication of Hisham II in favour of Muhammad. He named his cousin Abd al-Jabbar ibn al-Muguira to the office of hajib and sent him at the head of his supporters to Sanchuelo's residence of az-Zahira, which was immediately surrendered. The residence was then looted down to the building stone over several days until all that was left was a pile of rubble.

Rather than immediately return to the city, Abd al-Rahman took his army to Calatrava where he dithered while testing the loyalty of his troops. He failed to entice them into renewing their oaths of allegiance to him, and this delay gave Muhammad time to consolidate his control of Córdoba.

With his army leaking away, Sanchuelo turned to his Christian rebel ally, García Gómez, count of Carrión, a member of the Banu Gómez clan, who had joined in his campaign against León. García encouraged him to abandon Córdoba and take refuge in the Christian north, but Sanchuelo was convinced that his presence near the city would cause his supporters to rise up and restore him. Accompanied by the count's own men at arms, he set off toward the capital only to have his Berber army desert him, and on 3 March he reached Armilat, the last stop before the city, with just his own household, which included a harem of 70 women, and the Banu Gómez troops. There the next day they were surrounded by a group of horsemen sent by Muhammad, and with Abd al-Rahmen expressing a willingness to submit, the group were marched toward Córdoba, meeting a larger force under the new hajib part way. During a rest at an inn at dusk, Sanchuelo pulled a dagger in what was interpreted as a suicide attempt, and the hajib had him thrown to the ground and beheaded. Count García Gómez was also killed.

Abd al-Rahman Sanchuelo's deposition, coming four months after taking power, had dramatic effects on the political stability of al-Andalus. The success of Muhammad II encouraged other Umayyad scions and local lords to rise up, with the competitors each inviting the support from neighboring Christian states. This fundamentally changed the power dynamic in the peninsula, fracturing the Córdoba caliphate into dozens of warring taifas that paid tribute to their Christian allies, and allowing the latter to greatly expand their territories and to stabilize their control over these new lands by repopulating them with Christian migrants from the north and Mozarabs fleeing the chaos of the former caliphate.
