= 1130s =

Decade

The 1130s was a decade of the Julian Calendar which began on January 1, 1130, and ended on December 31, 1139.

== Events ==
=== 1130 ===
- January 22 – Jin–Song Wars: Jin forces take Hangzhou.
- February 4 – Jin–Song Wars: Jin forces take Shaoxing.
- February 14 – Pope Innocent II succeeds Pope Honorius II, as the 164th pope. Other factions (including Roger II of Sicily), however, support Anacletus II as pope, leading to the papal schism of 1130, and Innocent flees to France.
- March 26 – Magnus IV and his uncle Harald Gille become joint kings of Norway, starting the civil war era in Norway.
- April 24 – Jin–Song Wars: Battle of Huangtiandang – Naval forces of the Song dynasty trap Wuzhu's Jin troops in the city for 48 days.
- December 25 – Antipope Anacletus crowns Roger II of Sicily king.
- Approximate date – Magnus the Strong is deposed as king of Götaland, when Sverker the Elder proclaims himself king of Sweden.

=== 1131 ===
==== By place ====
====== Levant ======
- August 21 – King Baldwin II falls seriously ill, after his return from Antioch. He is moved to the patriarch's residence near the Holy Sepulchre, where he bequeaths the kingdom to his daughter Melisende, her husband Fulk and their infant son, Baldwin. He takes monastic vows, and dies soon after. Baldwin is buried in the Church of the Holy Sepulchre, at Jerusalem.
- September 14 – Melisende succeeds her father Baldwin II to the throne, and reigns jointly with Fulk, as King and Queen of Jerusalem. Their coronation, in the Church of the Holy Sepulchre, is celebrated with festivities.

====== Europe ======
- Ramon Berenguer III (the Great), count of Barcelona, dies after a 34-year reign. He leaves most of his Catalonian territories to his elder son Ramon Berenguer IV, who continues the fight against the Almoravid Muslims. His younger son Berenguer Ramon inherits Provence (Southern France) and will reign as Ramon I (until 1144).
- The Knights Templars appear in the North-East of Spain and are receiving privileges from King Alfonso I (the Battler). The Templars support him to regain land from the Almoravids. Alfonso grants them exemption of tax on a fifth of the wealth taken from the Muslims. The Templars found their first stronghold in Aragon.
- October 13 – The 15-year-old Philip, eldest son of King Louis VI (the Fat) of France, dies when his horse trips over a black pig that darts out of a dung heap unexpectedly at a market in Paris.

==== By topic ====
====== Religion ======
- May 9 – Tintern Abbey is founded in Wales by Cistercian monks in the Wye Valley.
- Construction begins on the Beisi Pagoda in Jiangsu Province (approximate date).
- The Council of Rheims is held by several French bishops and many clergy.

=== 1132 ===
==== By place ====
====== Levant ======
- Summer – Imad al-Din Zengi, Seljuk governor (atabeg) of Aleppo and Mosul, marches on Baghdad (the capital of the Abbasid Caliphate), to add it to his dominions. He is defeated by the forces of Caliph Al-Mustarshid, near Tikrit (modern Iraq). Zengi flees and escapes, with the help of Tikrit's governor Najm ad-Din Ayyub (the father of Saladin), who conveys him across the River Tigris.

====== Europe ======
- July 24 – Battle of Nocera: Rebel Normans under Count Ranulf II defeat the Sicilian forces, led by King Roger II. Seven hundred knights are captured, and Roger is forced to retreat to Salerno.

====== England ======
- Barnwell Castle is erected in Northamptonshire.

====== Asia ======
- June – A fire breaks out in the Chinese capital of Hangzhou, destroying 13,000 houses and forcing many to flee to the nearby hills. Due to large fires as this, the government installs an effective fire fighting force for the city. Items such as bamboo, planks, and rush-matting are temporarily exempted from taxation, 120 tons of rice are distributed among the poor. The government suspends the housing rent requirement of the city's residents.
- The Southern Song court establishes the first permanent standing navy, with the headquarters of the Chinese admiralty based at Dinghai.

==== By topic ====
====== Religion ======
- Diarmait Mac Murchada has the abbey of Kildare in Ireland burned, and the abbess raped. He becomes king of the province of Leinster.
- Malachy is appointed archbishop of Armagh in Ireland, to impose the Roman liturgy on the independent Irish Church.
- March 5 – Rievaulx Abbey is founded by the Cistercian order, near Helmsley in Yorkshire.
- December 27 – Fountains Abbey soon to join the Cistercian order, is founded near Ripon in Yorkshire.
- Basingwerk Abbey originally Benedictine, and later Cistercian, is founded near Holywell in Wales.

=== 1133 ===
==== By place ====
====== Europe ======
- Spring – A German expeditionary force, led by King Lothair III, marches into northern Italy, and arrives at Rome, after a 6-month journey across the Alps. Accompanied by Bernard of Clairvaux, French abbot and Doctor of the Church, Lothair is crowned by Pope Innocent II as Holy Roman Emperor at the Church of the Lateran, on June 4. He receives as papal fiefs the vast estates of Matilda, former margravine of Tuscany, which he secures for his daughter Gertrude of Süpplingenburg and her husband, Duke Henry X (the Proud) of Bavaria.
- July 17 – Battle of Fraga: The Castellan troops led by King Alfonso I (the Battler) defeat the Almoravid army, thanks to a timely intervention of a Norman Crusader army from Tarragona, led by Robert Bordet.
- Ramon Berenguer IV, count of Barcelona, launches a raid against Almoravid-held territories in Al-Andalus (modern Spain), and pillages the country all the way to Cadiz.

==== By topic ====
====== Religion ======
- The first convent on Iceland, the Þingeyraklaustur, is inaugurated at a monastery of the Order of Saint Benedict (located in Þingeyrar).
- Antipope Anacletus II forces Innocent II out of Rome following the departure of Lothair III. Innocent flees and takes a ship to Pisa.
- Geoffrey of Monmouth, an English cleric, writes the chronicle Historia Regum Britanniae.
- Rijnsburg Abbey is founded by Petronilla of Lorraine, countess and regent of Holland.
- Construction of the chapter house at Durham Cathedral which is completed in 1140.

=== 1134 ===
==== By place ====
====== Asia ======
- Count Hugh II (du Puiset), in alliance with the Egyptian city of Ascalon, revolts against King Fulk V of Jerusalem, attempting to take Jaffa. Hugh submits to Fulk and is exiled for three years. While awaiting for a boat to Italy he is attacked by a Breton knight, but survives the attempted murder. Hugh retires to the Sicilian court of his cousin, King Roger II, who appoints him to the lordship of Gargano, where he dies soon afterwards.
- Mas'ud becomes sultan of the Seljuk dynasty in Hamadan.
- Yelü Dashi captures Balasagun from the Kara-Khanid Khanate, marking the start of the Qara Khitai empire (and its Kangguo era) in Central Asia.
- Wu Ge, Chinese Song Dynasty Deputy Transport Commissioner of Zhejiang, has paddle wheel warships constructed with a total of nine wheels, and others with thirteen wheels.

====== Eastern Europe ======
- Vsevolod Mstislavich of Novgorod defeats the Chuds and captures Tartu.
- Yuri Dolgoruki founds the town of Skniatino.
- Iziaslav II of Kiev becomes Prince of Vladimir and Volyn.
- Viacheslav of Kiev becomes Prince of Turov.

====== Mediterranean ======
- Ermengarde becomes Viscountess of Narbonne.
- Narbonne is seized by Alphonse I of Toulouse.
- Battle of Fraga: Castillan forces are defeated by Muslim troops. King Alfonso I (the Battler) is killed and succeeded by his brother Ramiro II as ruler of Aragon. In Navarre the nobility elects Garcia VI as Alfonso's successor.
- Roger II of Sicily defeats a revolt in Naples.
- Called by Olegarius, the bishop of Tarragona, the Knights Templar establish their first stronghold in Catalonia.

====== Scandinavia ======
- Battle of Färlev: Magnus IV of Norway defeats Harald IV Gille of Norway.
- Battle of Fotevik: Harald Kesja and Magnus the Strong are defeated by the forces of Erik Emune.
- Eric II becomes King of Denmark.
- The House of Brandenburg is founded, when Albrecht the Bear is made head of the Nordmark.

====== Western Europe ======
- Aed mac Domnaill becomes King of Ui Failghe.
- Much of Chartres, France, is destroyed by fire.
- Henry of Lausanne is sentenced to imprisonment by Pope Innocent II.
- The Zeeland archipelago is created by a massive storm in the North Sea.
- Herman III (the Great), margrave of Baden, marries Bertha of Lorraine.

==== By topic ====
====== Culture ======
- May 13 – The Saint-Denis basilica, near Paris, is damaged by a fire. This will give the opportunity to the French abbot Suger to rebuild it in a new style, which will open the Gothic period of architecture.
- The University of Salamanca is established, in the Kingdom of León.
- Abdul Qadir Jilani becomes principal of the Hanbali school in Baghdad.
- The Japanese classic text Uchigikishu is written.
- Robert of Ketton and Herman of Carinthia travel throughout France, the Byzantine Empire, and the Crusader States.

====== Religion ======
- Cormac's Chapel is consecrated.
- Malachy becomes archbishop of Armagh.
- The Church of St. James is dedicated in Glasgow.
- The Augustinian Runcorn Priory is transferred to Norton Priory.
- Buckfastleigh Abbey is refounded.
- Aelred of Hexham enters the monastery at Rievaulx Abbey.
- Stephen Harding becomes abbot of Cîteaux Abbey.
- Hugh of Grenoble is canonized by Innocent II.
- The Cathedral of St. Petri in Schleswig is completed.
- The Abbey of St. Jacob is founded in Würzburg.
- Evermode of Ratzeburg becomes abbot of Gottesgnaden.
- The Humiliati retreat to a monastery in Milan.
- Leo Styppes becomes Patriarch of Constantinople.

=== 1135 ===
==== By place ====
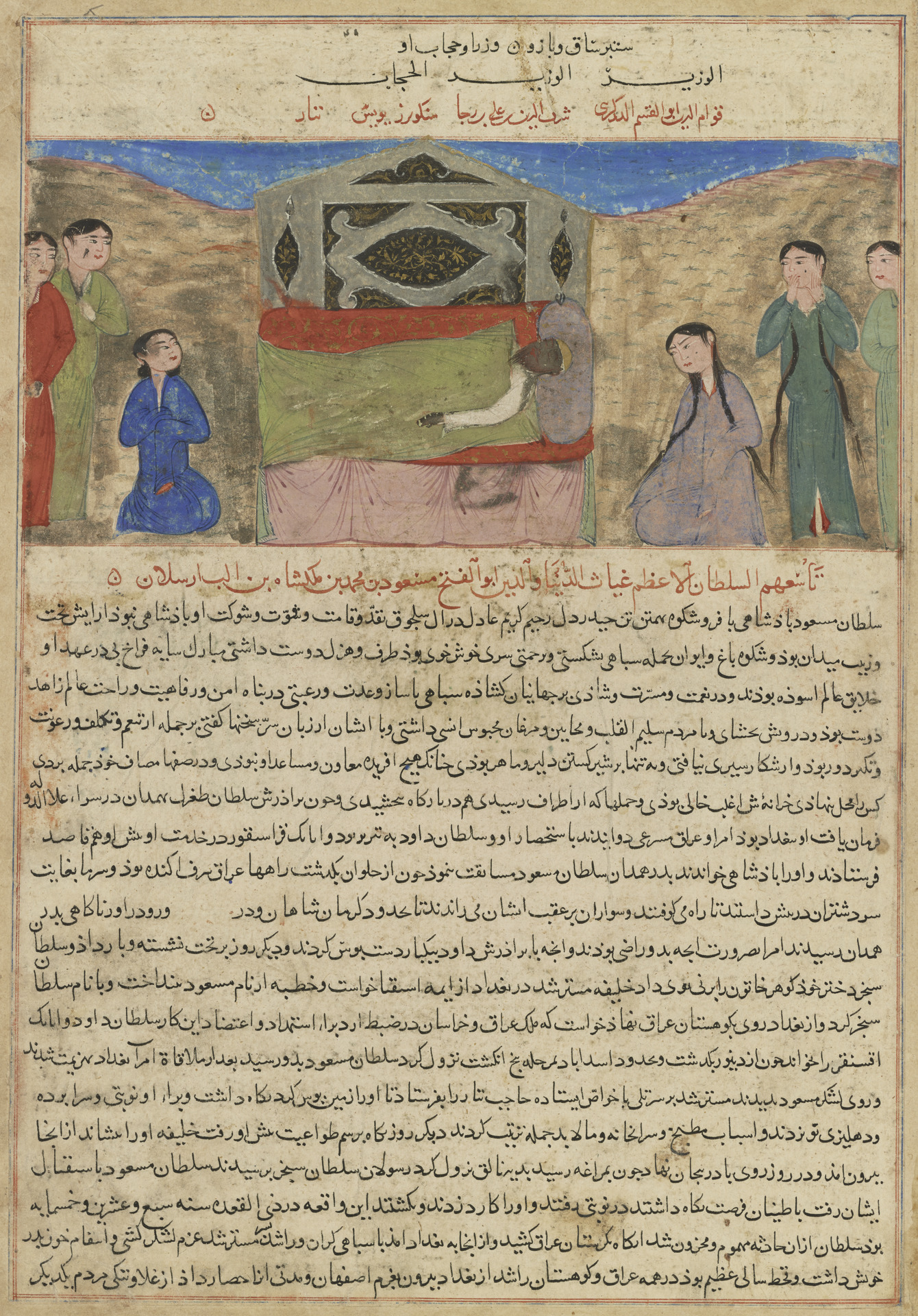
Assassination of Al-Mustarshid in 1135

====== Levant ======
- Spring – Shams al-Mulk Isma'il, Seljuk ruler of Damascus, sends envoys to Imad al-Din Zengi, Seljuk ruler of Mosul, to seek his protection in exchange of Damascus. Zengi crosses the Euphrates, receiving the surrender of the city of Hama. He besieges Damascus but, due to a shortage of supplies, is forced to abandon the siege. Zengi extricates himself from Damascus, his Seljuk forces capture the fortresses at Ma'arrat and Atharib.
- Queen Melisende of Jerusalem reconciles with her husband Fulk V, after a period of estrangement occasioned by her growing power, and rumors that she has had an affair with Hugh II (du Puiset), former count of Jaffa.

====== Europe ======
- January 7 – King Harald IV returns with Danish reinforcements and the support of King Eric II ("the Memorable"). He captures his nephew and joint ruler Magnus IV (Sigurdsson), who is blinded, castrated – and confined in Nidarholm Abbey (located on the island of Munkholmen).
- May 26 – King Alfonso VII is crowned as "Emperor of All Spain" (Imperator totius Hispaniae) in the Cathedral of León. The coronation is attended by Ramon Berenguer IV (his brother-in-law), Raymond V and other Spanish nobles who have recognize him as their overlord.
- Summer – King Roger II lands with a Sicilian expeditionary force in Salerno. He splits his army, and conquers the cities of Aversa and Alife. Roger besieges Naples – but despite poor health conditions within the city, he is not able to take it, and returns again to Messina.
- August 15 – Emperor Lothair III receives homage from Eric II, and makes him an imperial prince at the Reichstag. His diplomatic missions to Hungary and Poland result in a tribute payment. Duke Bolesław III Wrymouth is given Pomerania and Rügen as German fiefs.
- Lothair III receives a Byzantine embassy at his court, on behalf of Emperor John II Komnenos. It offers large financial subsidies for Lothair to start a campaign against Roger II. The negotiations will last for some months.
- September – King García IV ("the Restorer") breaks with Alfonso VII, and makes common cause with the County of Portugal against Castile and León.
- October – Conrad III, duke of Franconia, gives up his title as King of Italy in opposition with Lothair III. He receives a pardon and recovers his estates.
- Pisans in the service of the Holy See (Diocese of Rome) sack the city of Amalfi.
- A Moorish fleet raids the Catalan port-town of Elna (Southern France).

====== England ======
- December 1 – King Henry I dies at Lyons-la-Forêt in Normandy after a 35-year reign. He is succeeded by his nephew Stephen of Blois (grandson of William the Conqueror), who asserts his claim to the throne in opposition to claims by Henry's daughter Matilda (prolonged in a civil war known as The Anarchy).
- December 26 – Stephen of Blois is crowned at Westminster Abbey in London by Archbishop William de Corbeil. Matilda (pregnant with child) and her husband Geoffrey V ("the Fair") leave for their own safety to Normandy, where she plans how to overthrow Stephen and claim the English throne for her own.

====== Middle East ======
- August 29 – Caliph Al-Mustarshid is assassinated at Baghdad after a 17-year reign. He is succeeded by his son Al-Rashid Billah as ruler of the Abbasid Caliphate (until 1138).

====== North Africa ======
- Summer – A Sicilian expeditionary force led by Roger II embarks from Messina and takes the island of Djerba (modern Tunisia).
- The Hammadid Emirate (modern Algeria) launches an assault against the city of Mahdia (modern Tunisia).

====== Asia ======
- Jin–Song War – Song forces under Yue Fei begin a counteroffensive against the Jurchen-ruled Jin dynasty in northern China. He defeats Jin forces, by entangling his paddle-wheel ships at the Huai River.
- June 4 – Emperor Hui Zong dies in exile in Heilongjiang (Manchuria), having been held prisoner with his son Qin Zong since their capture in 1127.

==== By topic ====
====== Religion ======
- January – Byland Abbey is founded in England by the Congregation of Savigny.
- Buildwas Abbey is founded in England by Roger de Clinton, bishop of Coventry.

=== 1136 ===
==== By place ====
====== Levant ======
- Spring – Raymond of Poitiers, son of the late Duke William IX of Aquitaine, arrives at Antioch. Patriarch Ralph of Domfront (against the wishes of Princess Alice) arranges a marriage in secret with her 8-year-old daughter Constance. She is kidnapped and taken to the cathedral in Antioch, where Ralph hastily marries her to Raymond. Alice leaves the city, now under the control of Raymond and Ralph, and retires to Latakia, Syria.
- August 17 – Al-Rashid is deposed after a 1-year reign and flees to Isfahan (modern Iran). He is succeeded by his uncle Al-Muqtafi who becomes the new caliph of the Abbasid Caliphate in Baghdad (until 1160).

====== Europe ======
- May 28 – In Russia, the people of Novgorod depose and imprison Prince Vsevolod of Pskov. Novgorod asserts its independence from Kiev, but accepts protection from neighboring Kievan princes. In July, Vsevolod along with his wife and family are released (they are exiled to an uncle in Kiev).
- Summer – Emperor Lothair III invades southern Italy in response to the appeal of Emperor John II Komnenos (see 1135) and conquers Apulia from King Roger II of Sicily. Duke Grimoald of Bari, supported by Lothair III, rebels against Roger.
- December 14 – King Harald IV of Norway is murdered by Sigurd Slembe, an illegitimate son of the late King Magnus Barefoot. He is succeeded by his sons Inge I ("the Hunchback) and his 3-year-old half-brother Sigurd II.

====== Britain ======
- Spring – King David I of Scotland invades northern England and captures many of the major towns including Carlisle and Newcastle. In response, King Stephen raises an army (with Flemish mercenaries), and marches to Durham. David agrees to negotiate a peace between the two countries.
- February 5 – Treaty of Durham: A peace treaty is signed by Stephen and David I. The Scots are allowed to keep Carlisle and a part of Cumberland in return for stopping their advance. David refuses an oath of allegiance, as his loyalties rest with Matilda (daughter of the late King Henry I).
- October – Battle of Crug Mawr (Great Barrow): King Owain Gwynedd (styled "Prince of Wales") defeats the Norman and Flemish forces under Robert Fitz Martin, securing the control of Ceredigion (West Wales).

====== Africa ======
- The city of Béjaïa (modern Algeria) repels a Genoan naval assault.

====== Asia ======
- Sultan Mudzaffar Shah I establishes the Kedah Sultanate at Qodah Darul Aman (modern-day Kedah Darul Aman, Malaysia).

==== By topic ====
====== Arts and Culture ======
- The Basilica of Saint-Denis is completed to designs by Abbot Suger in Paris, France.
- Peter Abelard writes the Historia Calamitatum, detailing his relationship with Heloise.

====== Religion ======
- Hildegard of Bingen becomes abbess of the Benedictine monastery of Disibodenberg, upon the death of Jutta von Sponheim.
- Worship at the original Glasgow Cathedral in Scotland begins.
- Melrose Abbey (located in the Scottish Borders) is founded by Cistercian monks at the request of David.

=== 1137 ===
==== By place ====
====== Byzantine Empire ======
- Spring – Emperor John II (Komnenos) leads a Byzantine expeditionary force into Cilicia (the Byzantine fleet guards his flank). He defeats the Armenians under Prince Leo I ("Lord of the Mountains"), and captures the cities of Mersin, Tarsus, Adana and Mamistra. Leo retreats to the great fortifications of Anazarbus – where its garrison resists for 37 days. The Byzantine siege engines batter down its walls, and the city is forced to surrender. Leo escapes into the Taurus Mountains, while the Byzantine forces march southward into the plain of Antioch.
- August 29 – John II appears before the walls of Antioch, and encamps with the Byzantine army on the north bank of the Orontes River. For several days he besieges the city, Raymond of Poitiers (prince of Antioch) is forced to surrender. He recognizes John as his suzerain and becomes with Joscelin II (count of Edessa) a vassal of the Byzantine Empire.

====== Levant ======
- March 25 – Bazwāj, a mamluk (slave) commander of Damascus, launches a military campaign against Tripoli, reaching Pilgrims' Mount. He defeats a Crusader army under Count Pons (protector of Tripoli). Pons is forced to flee into the mountains where native Christians capture him. Later, he is handed over and instantly put to death by Bazwāj.
- Summer – Battle of Ba'rin: A Crusader force led by King Fulk of Jerusalem is scattered and defeated by Imad al-Din Zengi, Seljuk governor (atabeg) of Mosul. Fulk with a small bodyguard escapes into Montferrand Castle, which is surrounded and besieged by Zengi. After negotiations, Fulk is granted his freedom in exchange for the castle.

====== Europe ======
- April 9 – William X (the Saint), duke of Aquitaine, dies while on a pilgrimage to Santiago de Compostela (modern Spain). On his deathbed, he expresses his wish to see King Louis VI (the Fat) of France as protector of his 15-year-old daughter Eleanor, and to find her a suitable husband.
- July 25 – Louis VI sends his 16-year-old son Louis Capet with an escort of 500 knights to Bordeaux, along with Abbot Suger in charge of the wedding arrangements. Louis and Eleanor are married in the Cathedral of Saint-André. France unites Aquitaine and its territories to the Pyrenees.
- August 1 – Louis VI dies of dysentery at Paris after a 29-year reign. He is succeeded by Louis Capet (known as Louis VII) as King of France. During his accession the burgesses of Orléans and Poitiers revolt – who wish to organise communes (creating independent city-states).
- August 11 – Ramon Berenguer IV, count of Barcelona, is married to Princess Petronilla of Aragon (only 1-year-old) – whose father, King Ramiro II of Aragon, seeks aid from Barcelona against King Alfonso VII of Castile, abdicates the throne in favor of Ramon on November 13.
- October 30 – Battle of Rignano: Sergius VII, duke (magister militum) of Naples, is defeated by the Sicilian forces under King Roger II of Sicily. Sergius is killed and Roger establishes direct control over Naples – nominating his 17-year-old son Alfonso of Capua as the new duke.
- December 4 – Emperor Lothair III dies at Breitenwang in Tyrol, while retreating from Italy after a mutiny among his troops. His son-in-law Henry X (the Proud), duke of Bavaria, inherits the Duchy of Saxony.
- An Almoravid fleet of 37 ships attack the coasts of southern Italy, under Norman rule.

====== Britain ======
- Spring – King Stephen sails to Normandy to confront Geoffrey V (the Fair) and the Angevins, who are attacking the southern areas of Normandy. Although Stephen has some success, he is not able to recapture Normandy from Matilda, daughter and heiress of the late King Henry I.
- King Gruffudd ap Cynan of Gwynedd dies after a 56-year reign, having rebuilt Welsh power overturned earlier by Henry I. He is succeeded by his son Owain Gwynedd who together with his other brothers, Cadwaladr and Cadwallon, work to revive the power of Gwynedd in Wales.
- June 3 – A fire severely damages Rochester Cathedral, but it is soon rebuilt.
- June 4 – A fire destroys much of the city of York, including 39 churches and York Minster.
- June 27 – A fire severely damages the city of Bath.

====== Africa ======
- In the first commercial treaty between the Almohad Caliphate and a Christian power, the Republic of Genoa obtains trading rights in the port of North Africa.
- The Ethiopian Empire is established by Emperor Mara Takla Haymanot of the Zagwe Dynasty.

====== Asia ======
- In China during the Song Dynasty, a fire breaks out in the new capital of Hangzhou. The government suspends the requirement of rent payments, alms of 108,840 kg (120 tons) of rice are distributed to the poor, and items such as bamboo, planks and rush-matting are exempted from government taxation.

=== 1138 ===
==== By place ====
====== Europe ======
- March 7 – Conrad III is elected as King of Germany, in the presence of the papal legate Theodwin at Koblenz. He is crowned at Aachen six days later (on March 13), and acknowledged in Bamberg by several German princes of southern Germany. Henry X (the Proud), son-in-law and heir of the late King Lothair III, refuses his allegiance to Conrad. He is deprived of all his Saxon territories, which are given to Leopold IV (the Generous).
- Summer – A civil war breaks out in the Holy Roman Empire, a struggle begins between the Guelphs and Ghibellines, while the family name Welf of Henry X will be corrupted into Guelph.
- October 20 – Bolesław III (Wrymouth) dies after a 31-year reign. He divides Poland among his sons: Władyslaw II (the Exile) receives Silesia and the Senioral territories – which includes the Kraków and Łęczyca regions, as well as parts of Kujawy and Wielkopolska ("Greater Poland"). Bolesław IV (the Curly) receives Masovia and Mieszko III receives the newly established Duchy of Greater Poland. The 7-year-old Henry becomes duke of Sandomierz. Bolesław's last son, Casimir II receives nothing, as he is born after his father's death.

====== Britain ======
- May – Earl Robert FitzRoy rebels against King Stephen, supporting Matilda (his step-sister) in her claim for the English throne. Matilda is given refuge by Earl William de Albini at Arundel Castle. Stephen builds siege works around the castle, but is unable to break the castle's defences. In France, Matilda's husband Duke Geoffrey V (the Fair) takes advantage of the situation by re-invading Normandy.
- August 22 – Battle of the Standard: King David I of Scotland gives his full support to Matilda (daughter of the late King Henry I), and invades the north of England – travelling as far south as Lincolnshire. The Scottish army (some 15,000 men) is defeated by English forces under Earl William le Gros in Yorkshire. David retreats to Carlisle and reassembles an army.
- The Earldom of Pembroke, created for Gilbert de Clare, becomes the first earldom created by Stephen within the borders in Wales. Gilbert receives the rape and Pevensey Castle.

====== Middle East ======
- Spring – Emperor John II (Komnenos) leads a Byzantine expeditionary force into Syria and arrives before the walls of Aleppo on April 20. The city proves too strong to attack, but the fortresses of Biza'a, Athareb, Ma'arrat Nu'man and Kafartab are taken by assault. While the Byzantines besiege the city of Shaizar, the Crusader allies Prince Raymond of Poitiers of Antioch and Count Joscelin II of Edessa remain in their camp playing dice.
- Siege of Shaizar: The Byzantines under John II besiege the capital of the Munqidhite Emirate. They capture the lower city on May 20, but fail to take the citadel. John negotiates with Emir Abu'l Asakir Sultan – who sends him an offer to pay a large indemnity and becoming a vassal of the Byzantine Empire. John, disgusted by his Crusader allies, accepts the terms and raises the siege on May 21.
- October 11 – An earthquake in Aleppo, Syria, kills about 230,000 people.
- Al-Rashid Billah (Deposed caliph of Baghdad) fled to Isfahan where he was assassinated by a team of four Nizari Ismailis (Assassins) in June 1138. This was celebrated in Alamut for a week by Shias.

====== Asia ======
- November 5 – Lý Anh Tông is enthroned as emperor of Đại Việt at the age of two, starting a 37-year reign.

==== By topic ====
====== Religion ======
- April 10 – Robert Warelwast is nominated as bishop of Exeter at a royal council in Northampton, England.

=== 1139 ===
==== By region ====
====== Asia ======
- July 8 or August 21 – Jin–Song Wars – Battle of Yancheng: Song dynasty general Yue Fei defeats an army led by Jin dynasty general Wuzhu.
- September 30 – A magnitude 7.7 earthquake strikes the Caucasus mountains in the Seljuk Empire, causing great devastation and killing 300,000 people.

====== Europe ======
- January 25 – Godfrey II, Count of Louvain becomes Duke of Lower Lorraine.
- April 8 – Second Council of the Lateran: Roger II of Sicily is excommunicated by Pope Innocent II.
- April 9 – The Treaty of Durham is signed, between King Stephen of England and David I of Scotland.
- July 22 – Pope Innocent II, invading the Kingdom of Sicily, is ambushed at Galluccio and taken prisoner.
- July 25
  - By the Treaty of Mignano, Pope Innocent II proclaims Roger II of Sicily as King of Sicily, Duke of Apulia and Prince of Capua.
  - Battle of Ourique: The independence of Portugal from the Kingdom of León is declared after the Almoravids, led by Ali ibn Yusuf, are defeated by Prince Afonso Henriques. He then becomes Afonso I, King of Portugal, after calling the first assembly of the Estates-General of Portugal at Lamego, where he is given the Crown from the Bishop of Bragança, to confirm the independence.

==== By topic ====
====== Education ======
- King's School, Pontefract, in England is founded.

====== Religion ======
- April – Second Council of the Lateran: The Anacletus schism is settled, and priestly celibacy is made mandatory within the Catholic Church.
- November – Alberic of Ostia, papal legate to Outremer, convenes a legatine council in the cathedral of Antioch to examine the conduct of the Latin patriarch. The council is also attended by the Armenian Catholicos Gregory III and marks a symbolic beginning for Armenian-Latin ecclesiastic high-level contacts.

== Significant people ==
- Al-Mustarshid
- Pope Innocent II
- Al-Rashid Billah
- Al-Muqtafi

== Births ==
1130

- Eustace IV of Boulogne, a Count of Boulogne and the son and heir of King Stephen of England (approximate date; d. 1153)
- Daoji, Chinese Buddhist monk (d. 1207)
- Baldwin III of Jerusalem (d. 1162)
- Richard de Clare, 2nd Earl of Pembroke (d. 1176)
- Zhu Xi, Chinese Confucian scholar (d. 1200)

1131

- January 14 – Valdemar I (the Great), king of Denmark (d. 1182)
- November 8 – Myeongjong, Korean king of Goryeo (d. 1202)
- Eudoxia of Kiev, high duchess of Poland (approximate date)
- Henry of Sandomierz, Polish nobleman (approximate date)
- Fujiwara no Teishi, Japanese noblewoman (d. 1176)
- Ladislaus II, king of Hungary and Croatia (d. 1163)
- Nakayama Tadachika, Japanese nobleman (d. 1195)

1132

- February 2 – William of Norwich, English martyr (d. 1144)
- April 21 – Sancho VI (the Wise), king of Navarre (d. 1194)
- Andronikos Kontostephanos, Byzantine aristocrat (or 1133)
- Ephraim of Bonn, German Jewish rabbi and writer (d. 1196)
- Maurice II de Craon, Norman nobleman and knight (d. 1196)
- Philip of France, French prince and archdeacon (d. 1160)
- Rhys ap Gruffydd, Welsh prince of Deheubarth (d. 1197)
- Vladimir III Mstislavich, Kievan Grand Prince (d. 1171)

1133

- February 23 – Al-Zafir, Fatimid caliph (d. 1154)
- March 5 – Henry II (Curtmantle), king of England (d. 1189)
- May 13 – Hōnen, Japanese religious reformer (d. 1212)
- Abu al-Abbas al-Jarawi, Moroccan poet (d. 1212)
- Andronikos Doukas Angelos, Byzantine aristocrat
- Andronikos Kontostephanos, Byzantine aristocrat
- Blanche of Navarre, Queen of Castile (d.1156)
- Faidiva of Toulouse, countess of Savoy (d. 1154)
- Jean de Gisors, Norman nobleman (d. 1220)
- Ralph de Sudeley, English nobleman (d. 1192)
- Sigurd II (or Sigurd Munn), king of Norway (d. 1155)
- Stephen IV, king of Hungary and Croatia (d. 1165)
- Thorlak Thorhallsson, Icelandic bishop (d. 1193)
- Urraca of Castile, queen of Navarre (d. 1179)
- Zhang Shi, Chinese Confucian scholar (d. 1181)

1134

- June 1 – Geoffrey VI, count of Nantes (d. 1158)
- September 9 – Abdul Razzaq Gilani, Persian jurist (d. 1207)
- Bernhard III, German nobleman (approximate date)
- Fujiwara no Kinshi, Japanese empress (d. 1209)
- Gerardo dei Tintori, Italian mystic and founder (d. 1207)
- Neophytos of Cyprus, Cypriot Orthodox priest (d. 1214)
- Oda of Brabant (or Anderlues), Belgian prioress (d. 1158)
- Oldřich (or Oldericus), duke of Olomouc (d. 1177)
- Ralph I, French nobleman (approximate date)
- Raymond V, count of Toulouse (approximate date)
- Sancho III (the Desired), king of Castile (d. 1158)
- Sverker I (the Elder), king of Sweden (d. 1156)
- Yesugei (Baghatur), Mongol chieftain (d. 1171)

1135

- Abu Yaqub Yusuf, caliph of the Almohad Caliphate (d. 1184)
- Adachi Morinaga, Japanese warrior monk (d. 1200)
- Albert of Chiatina, Italian archpriest and saint (d. 1202)
- André of Brienne, French nobleman (approximate date)
- Bogumilus, archbishop of Gniezno (approximate date)
- Burhan al-Din al-Marghinani, Arabic Hanafi jurist (d. 1197)
- Conrad of Hohenstaufen, German nobleman (d. 1195)
- Fernando Afonso, Portuguese Grand Master (d. 1207)
- Gertrude of Flanders, countess of Savoy (d. 1186)
- Hafsa bint al-Hajj al-Rukuniyya, Andalusian poet (d. 1190)
- Henry Fitz Eylwin, 1st Lord Mayor of London (d. 1212)
- Herman IV, margrave of Baden and Verona (d. 1190)
- Hugh de Willoughby, English nobleman (d. 1205)
- Inge I ("the Hunchback"), king of Norway (d. 1161)
- Joachim of Fiore, Italian theologian and mystic (d. 1202)
- Karl Jónsson, Icelandic clergyman and poet (d. 1213)
- Magnus Haraldsson, king of Norway (approximate date)
- Maimonides, Almoravid philosopher and physician (d. 1204)
- Margaret of Navarre, queen of Sicily (approximate date)
- Minamoto no Yoshishige, Japanese samurai (d. 1202)
- Sharaf al-Dīn al-Tūsī, Persian mathematician (d. 1213)
- Simone Doria, Genoese admiral (approximate date)
- Roger de Newburgh, English nobleman (d. 1192)
- Rudolf of Zähringen, German archbishop (d. 1191)
- Samson of Tottington, English monk and abbot (d. 1211)
- Walkelin de Derby (or Ferrers), Norman nobleman (d. 1190)
- William of the White Hands, French archbishop (d. 1202)
- Xie (Xiaozong), Chinese empress of the Song dynasty (d. 1207)

1136

- July 22 – William of Anjou, viscount of Dieppe (d. 1164)
- Amalric I (or Amalricus), king of Jerusalem (d. 1174)
- Humbert III (the Blessed), count of Savoy (d. 1189)
- Ismail al-Jazari, Artuqid polymath and inventor (d. 1206)
- Marie I (or Mary), countess consort of Boulogne (d. 1182)
- William of Newburgh, English historian and writer (d. 1198)
- Xia (Shenfu), Chinese empress consort (d. 1167)

1137

- Agnes of Poland, Grand Princess of Kiev (d. 1182)
- Bretislav III, bishop of Prague (approximate date)
- Ferdinand II, king of León and Galicia (d. 1188)
- Henry VI, king of Germany (approximate date)
- Ibn Qalaqis, Fatimid poet and writer (d. 1172)
- Ludwig II, count of Württemberg (approximate date)
- Saladin (the Lion), sultan of Egypt and Syria (d. 1193)
- Walter Map, Welsh historian and writer (d. 1209)
- Wenceslaus II, duke of Bohemia (approximate date)
- William I of Blois, count of Boulogne (d. 1159)

1138

- Casimir II (the Just), duke of Poland (d. 1194)
- Conan IV (the Young), duke of Brittany (d. 1171)
- Fujiwara no Narichika, Japanese nobleman (d. 1178)
- Hōjō Tokimasa, Japanese nobleman and regent (d. 1215)
- Saladin (the Lion), sultan of Egypt and Syria (d. 1193)
- Taira no Shigemori, Japanese nobleman (d. 1179)
- Tancred ("the Monkey King"), king of Sicily (d. 1194)

1139

- June 16 – Emperor Konoe of Japan (d. 1155)
- Agnes II – abbess and artist (d. 1203)
- Conon of Naso, Basilian abbot (d. 1236)

== Deaths ==
1130

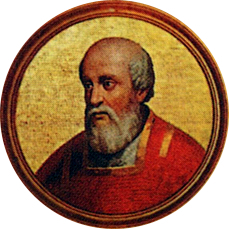
Pope Honorius II

- February 13 – Pope Honorius II (b. 1060)
- March 26 – King Sigurd I of Norway (b. c. 1090)
- October 16 – Pedro González de Lara, Castilian magnate
- November 11 – Teresa of León, Countess of Portugal, Portuguese regent (b. 1080)
- date unknown
  - Brahmadeva, Indian mathematician (b. 1060)
  - Maud, 2nd Countess of Huntingdon (b. 1074)
  - Robert of Bellême, 3rd Earl of Shrewsbury (b. 1052)
  - Alam al-Malika, Yemenite politician
  - Diemoth, German nun and writer (b. 1060) (approximately)

1131

- January 7 – Canute Lavard, duke of Schleswig (b. 1096)
- April 30 – Adjutor, French knight and saint
- August 21 – Baldwin II, king of Jerusalem
- August 30 – Hervey le Breton, English bishop
- October 5 – Frederick I, German archbishop
- October 13 – Philip, co-king of France (b. 1116)
- October 24 – Gerard II, count of Guelders
- November 16 – Dobrodeia of Kiev, Byzantine princess
- December 4 – Omar Khayyám, Persian astronomer (b. 1048)
- Abu Ali Ahmed ibn al-Afdal, Fatimid vizier
- Alger of Liège, French monk and writer (b. 1055)
- Andronikos Komnenos, Byzantine prince (or 1130)
- Ayn al-Quzat Hamadani, Persian philosopher (b. 1098)
- Elizabeth of Vermandois, English countess
- Feardana Ua Cárthaigh, Irish chief poet
- Gaston IV of Béarn, French nobleman
- Harald Haakonsson, Norse Earl of Orkney
- Joscelin I (Courtenay), count of Edessa
- Mahmud II, sultan of the Seljuk Empire
- Maud (or Matilda), queen of Scotland
- Meng, Chinese empress and regent (b. 1073)
- Ramon Berenguer III, count of Barcelona (b. 1082)
- Stephen II, king of Hungary and Croatia (b. 1101)
- Zheng (or Xiansu), Chinese empress (b. 1079)

1132

- February 9 – Maredudd ap Bleddyn, king of Powys (b. 1047)
- March 26 – Geoffrey of Vendôme, French abbot (b. 1070)
- April 1 – Hugh of Châteauneuf, bishop of Grenoble (b. 1053)
- April 14 – Mstislav I (the Great), Kievan Grand Prince (b. 1076)
- June 6 – Taj al-Muluk Buri, Seljuk governor and regent
- October 26 – Floris the Black, Dutch count of Holland
- Conrad von Plötzkau, margrave of the Northern March
- Hugh III of Le Puiset, French nobleman and crusader
- William of Zardana (or Saône), French nobleman (or 1133)

1133

- February 19 – Irene Doukaina, Byzantine empress (b. 1066)
- May 1 – Manegold von Mammern, German abbot
- December 4 – Bernard degli Uberti, Italian bishop
- December 18 – Hildebert, French hagiographer (b. 1055)
- December 21 – Guigues III (the Old), French nobleman
- Dirmicius of Regensburg, Irish monk and abbot
- Gregory of Catino, Italian monk and historian (b. 1060)
- þorlákur Runólfsson, Icelandic bishop (b. 1086)
- William of Zardana (or Saône), French nobleman

1134

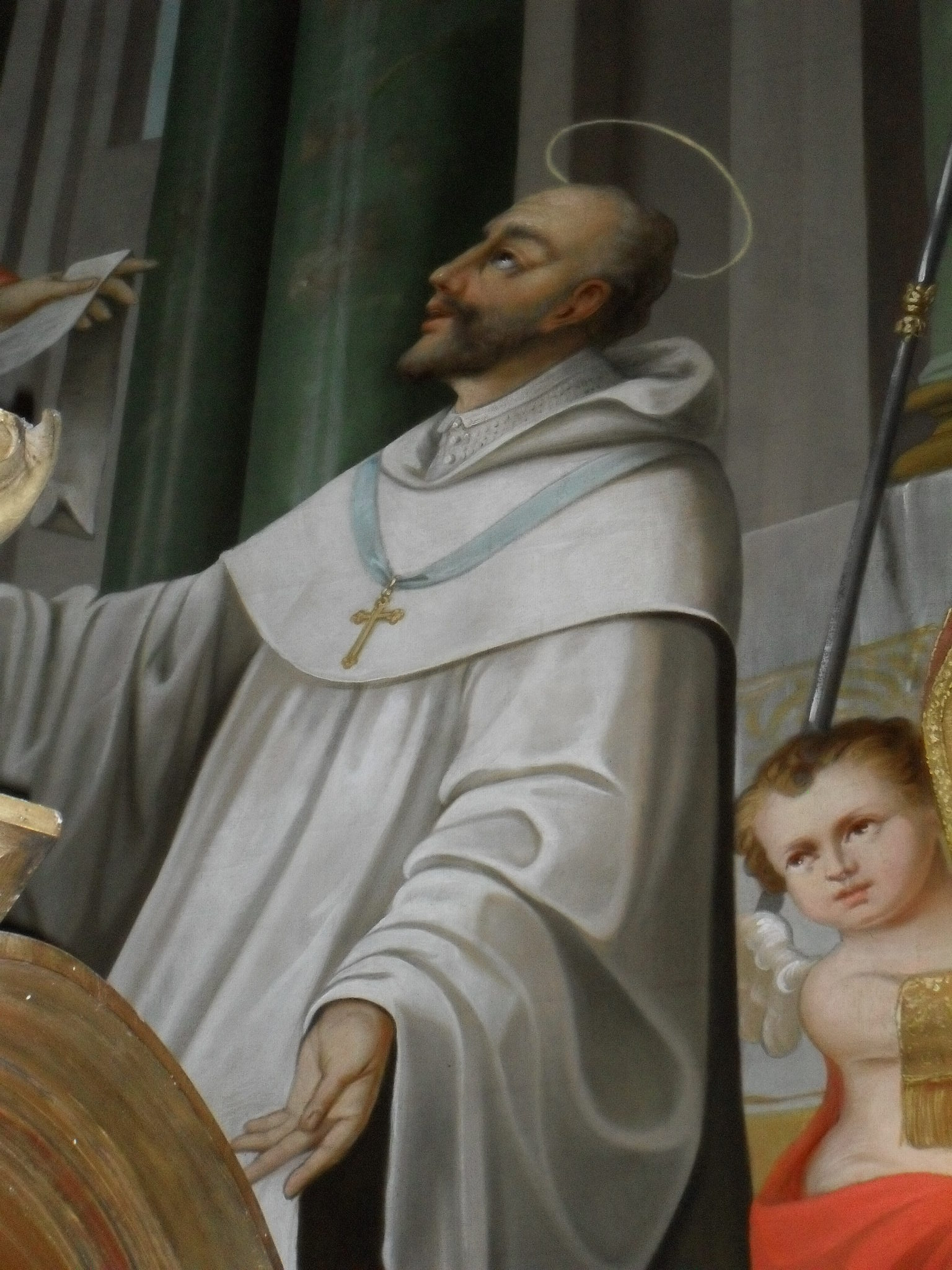
Saint Stephen Harding died on March 28, 1134

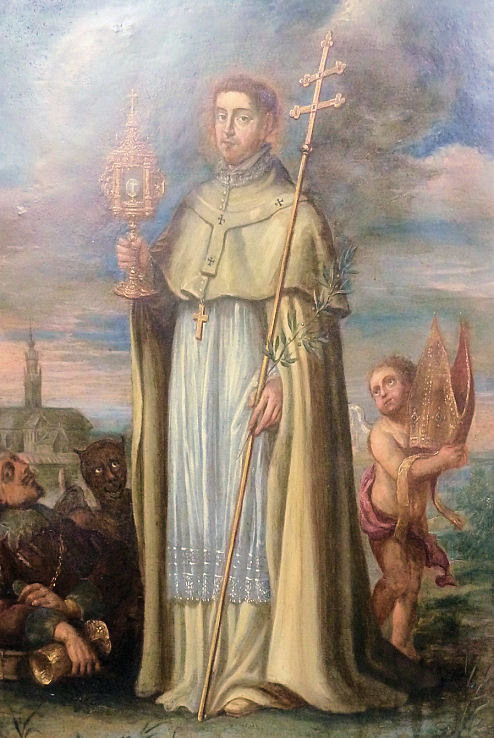
Norbert of Xanten died on June 6, 1134

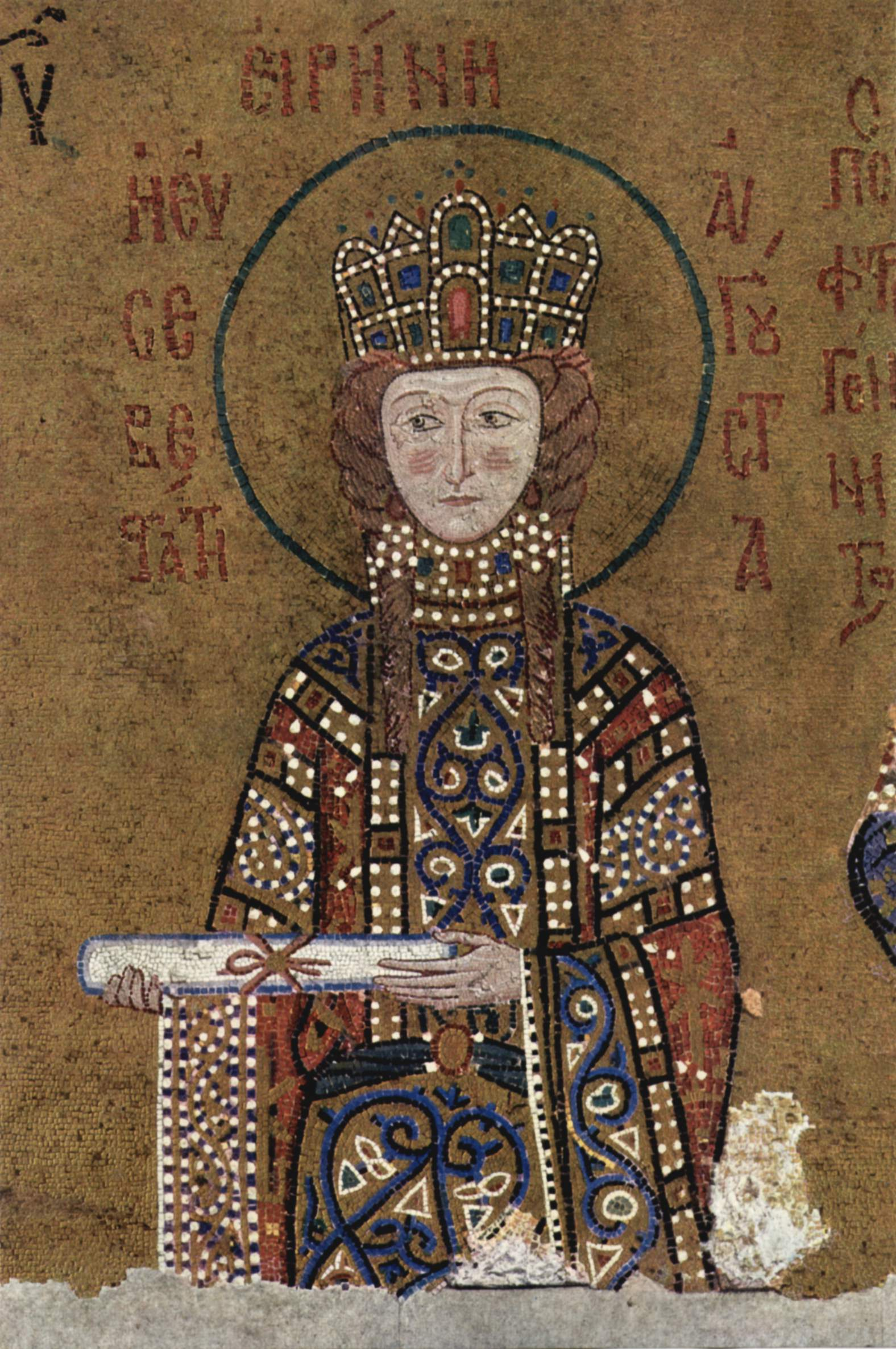
Saint Irene of Hungary died on August 13, 1134

- March 28 – Stephen Harding, English abbot
- June 4 – Magnus I (Nilsson), king of Sweden
- June 6 – Norbert of Xanten, German archbishop
- June 25 – Niels (or Nicholas), king of Denmark
- July 17
  - Beltrán de Risnel, Aragonese diplomat
  - Centule VI (or Centulle), French nobleman
- August 9 – Gilbert Universalis, English bishop
- August 13 – Irene of Hungary, Byzantine empress (b. 1088)
- September 7 – Alfonso I (the Battler), king of Aragon
- October 23 – Abu al-Salt, Andalusian astronomer
- Alexander of Jülich, prince-bishop of Liège
- Al-Fath ibn Khaqan, Andalusian anthologist
- Allucio of Campugliano, Italian diplomat (b. 1070)
- Bjørn Haraldsen (Ironside), Danish prince
- Hugh II (du Puiset), French nobleman
- John IX (Agapetos), Byzantine patriarch
- Mary and Eliza Chulkhurst, English conjoined twins (b. 1100)
- Minamoto no Yoshitsuna, Japanese samurai
- Robert II (Curthose), duke of Normandy (b. 1051)
- Urban (or Gwrgan), bishop of Llandaff (b. 1076)

1135

- February 1 – Shams al-Mulk Isma'il, Seljuk ruler (b. 1113)
- February 6 – Elvira of Castile, queen of Sicily (b. 1100)
- February 9 – Taizong, emperor of the Jin dynasty (b. 1075)
- May – Rainier (or Renier), marquess of Montferrat (b. 1084)
- June 4 – Huizong, emperor of the Song dynasty (b. 1082)
- August 9 – Wartislaw I, duke of Pomerania (b. 1091)
- August 29 – Al-Mustarshid, Abbasid caliph (b. 1092)
- December 1 – Henry I, king of England (b. 1068)
- Abd al-Majid ibn Abdun, Andalusian poet (b. 1050)
- Gerald de Windsor, English nobleman (b. 1075)
- Gisela of Burgundy, marchioness of Montferrat, French noblewoman (b. 1075)
- Harald Kesja ("the Spear"), king of Denmark (b. 1080)
- Liang Hongyu ("Red Jade"), Chinese female general (b. 1102)
- Meginhard I, Count of Sponheim, German nobleman (approximate date)
- Yuanwu Keqin, Chinese Chan Buddhist monk (b. 1063)

1136

- April 15 – Richard Fitz Gilbert de Clare, Norman nobleman
- May 24 – Hugues de Payens, French nobleman and knight
- November 15 – Leopold III, margrave of Austria (b. 1073)
- November 21 – William de Corbeil, archbishop of Canterbury
- December 14 – Harald IV (Servant of Christ), king of Norway
- Abraham bar Hiyya, Spanish mathematician and astronomer
- Jutta von Sponheim, German noblewoman and abbes (b. 1091)
- Gwenllian ferch Gruffydd, Welsh princess of Deheubarth
- Mael Isa Mac Mael Coluim, Irish monk and chronologist
- Wanyan Zonghan, Chinese nobleman and general (b. 1080)
- William VI, count of Auvergne and Velay (b. 1096)
- Zayn al-Din Gorgani, Persian physician (b. 1041)

1137

- January 21 – Guarin, Norman chancellor
- January 27 – John of Crema, Italian cardinal
- March 6 – Olegarius, archbishop of Tarragona (b. 1060)
- March 8 – Adela of Normandy, countess of Blois
- March 25 – Pons, count of Tripoli (b. 1098)
- April 9 – William X (the Saint), duke of Aquitaine (b. 1099)
- May 5 – Asser Thorkilsson, archbishop of Lund
- May 11 – Herlewin, English ascetic writer
- June 20 – John I, bishop of Rochester
- June 23 – Adalbert I, archbishop of Mainz
- July 10 – Pain FitzJohn, Norman nobleman
- August 1 – Louis VI (the Fat), king of France (b. 1081)
- September 18 – Eric II, king of Denmark (b. 1090)
- October 30 – Sergius VII, duke of Naples
- December 4 – Lothair III, Holy Roman Emperor (b. 1075)
- Amaury III de Montfort, French nobleman
- Bruno II of Berg, archbishop of Cologne
- Eustorge de Scorailles, bishop of Limoges
- Gottfried II of Raabs, German nobleman
- Gruffudd ap Cynan, king of Gwynedd
- Gruffydd ap Rhys, king of Deheubarth
- John XI bar Mawdyono, patriarch of Antioch
- Lucienne de Rochefort, French princess (b. 1088)
- Nicephorus Bryennius, Byzantine statesman (b. 1062)
- Ramanuja, Indian Sri Vaishnavism philosopher (b. 1017)

1138

- January 13 or January 14 – Simon I, duke of Lorraine (b. 1076)
- February 19 – Irene Doukaina, Byzantine empress
- May 11 – William de Warenne, 2nd Earl of Surrey
- May 27 – Hadmar I of Kuenring, German nobleman
- June 6 – Al-Rashid, caliph of the Abbasid Caliphate (b. 1109)
- August 12 – Suero Vermúdez, Asturian nobleman
- October 28 – Bolesław III (Wrymouth), duke of Poland (b. 1086)
- Amhlaoibh Mór mac Fir Bhisigh, Irish poet and cleric
- Arwa al-Sulayhi, queen and co-ruler of Yemen (b. 1048)
- Avempace, Andalusian polymath and philosopher (b. 1085)
- Chen Yuyi, Chinese politician of the Song dynasty (b. 1090)
- David the Scot, bishop of Bangor (approximate date)
- Kiya Buzurg Ummid, ruler of the Nizari Isma'ili State
- Rodrigo Martínez, Leonese nobleman and diplomat
- Rudolf of St. Trond, French Benedictine chronicler
- Someshvara III, ruler of the Western Chalukya Empire
- Vakhtang (or Tsuata), Georgian nobleman (b. 1118)

1139

- January 25 – Godfrey I, Count of Louvain and Duke of Lower Lorraine (as Godfrey VI)
- February 18 – Prince Yaropolk II of Kiev (b. 1082)
- October 20 – Henry X, Duke of Bavaria
- December – Roger of Salisbury, English bishop
- Empress Xing of China (b. 1106)

== Sources ==
- Fletcher, R. A. (1987). "Reconquest and Crusade in Spain c. 1050-1150". Transactions of the Royal Historical Society. 5. 37: 31–47. doi:10.2307/3679149. JSTOR 3679149.
- Johns, Jeremy (2002). Arabic Administration in Norman Sicily: The Royal Diwan. Cambridge Studies in Islamic Civilization. Cambridge University Press. p. 85. ISBN 978-0521816922.
- Kleinhenz, Christopher, ed. (2010). Medieval Italy: an encyclopedia. Vol. 1. Routledge. p. 95. ISBN 978-0415939294.
- McGrank, Lawrence (1981). "Norman crusaders in the Catalan reconquest: Robert Burdet and the principality of Tarragona, 1129-55". Journal of Medieval History. 7 (1): 67–82. doi:10.1016/0304-4181(81)90036-1.
- Meynier, Gilbert (2010). L'Algérie cœur du Maghreb classique. De l'ouverture islamo-arabe au repli (658-1518) (in French). Paris: La Découverte. p. 86. ISBN 978-2707152312.
- Picard, Christophe (1997). La mer et les musulmans d'occident au Moyen Âge, VIIIe-XIIIe siècle (in French). Presses Universitaires de France. ISBN 978-2130488101.
