= 1136 =

1136 in various calendars
- Gregorian calendar: 1136; MCXXXVI
- Ab urbe condita: 1889
- Armenian calendar: 585; ԹՎ ՇՁԵ
- Assyrian calendar: 5886
- Balinese saka calendar: 1057–1058
- Bengali calendar: 542–543
- Berber calendar: 2086
- English Regnal year: 1 Ste. 1 – 2 Ste. 1
- Buddhist calendar: 1680
- Burmese calendar: 498
- Byzantine calendar: 6644–6645
- Chinese calendar: 乙卯年 (Wood Rabbit); 3833 or 3626 — to — 丙辰年 (Fire Dragon); 3834 or 3627
- Coptic calendar: 852–853
- Discordian calendar: 2302
- Ethiopian calendar: 1128–1129
- Hebrew calendar: 4896–4897
- Hindu calendars
- Vikram Samvat: 1192–1193
- Shaka Samvat: 1057–1058
- Kali Yuga: 4236–4237
- Holocene calendar: 11136
- Igbo calendar: 136–137
- Iranian calendar: 514–515
- Islamic calendar: 530–531
- Japanese calendar: Hōen 2 (保延２年)
- Javanese calendar: 1042–1043
- Julian calendar: 1136; MCXXXVI
- Korean calendar: 3469
- Minguo calendar: 776 before ROC 民前776年
- Nanakshahi calendar: −332
- Seleucid era: 1447/1448 AG
- Thai solar calendar: 1678–1679
- Tibetan calendar: ཤིང་མོ་ཡོས་ལོ་ (female Wood-Hare); 1262 or 881 or 109 — to — མེ་ཕོ་འབྲུག་ལོ་ (male Fire-Dragon); 1263 or 882 or 110

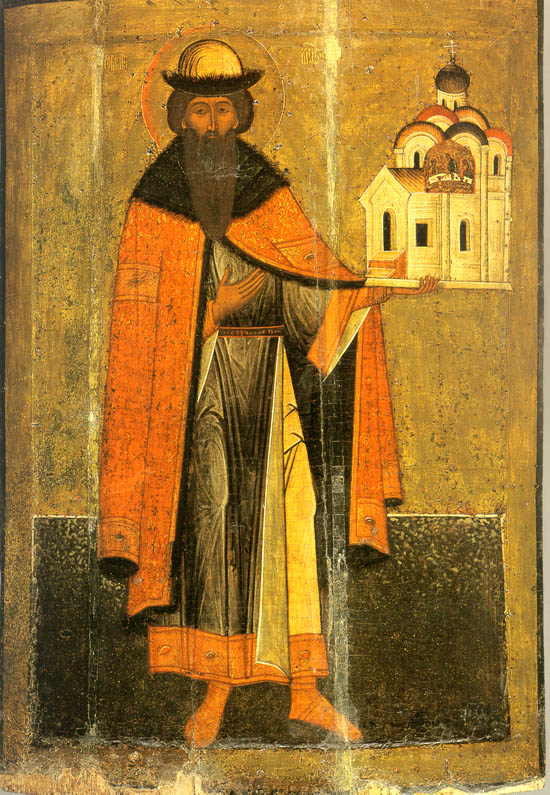
Vsevolod of Pskov (c. 1103–1138)

Year 1136 (MCXXXVI) was a leap year starting on Wednesday of the Julian calendar.

== Events ==
=== By place ===
==== Levant ====
- Spring – Raymond of Poitiers, son of the late Duke William IX of Aquitaine, arrives at Antioch. Patriarch Ralph of Domfront (against the wishes of Princess Alice) arranges a marriage in secret with her 8-year-old daughter Constance. She is kidnapped and taken to the cathedral in Antioch, where Ralph hastily marries her to Raymond. Alice leaves the city, now under the control of Raymond and Ralph, and retires to Latakia, Syria.
- August 14 – The siege of Bagdhad by the Seljuks ends after Abbasid caliph al-Rashid Billah flees to Mosul. Seljuk sultan Ghiyath ad-Din Mas'ud enters the city the following day.
- August 18 – Seljuk sultan Ghiyath ad-Din Mas'ud appoints al-Rashid Billah's uncle Al-Muqtafi as new caliph of the Abbasid Caliphate in Baghdad.

==== Europe ====
- May 28 – In Russia, the people of Novgorod depose and imprison Prince Vsevolod of Pskov. Novgorod asserts its independence from Kiev, but accepts protection from neighboring Kievan princes. In July, Vsevolod along with his wife and family are released (they are exiled to an uncle in Kiev).
- Summer – Emperor Lothair III invades southern Italy in response to the appeal of Emperor John II Komnenos (see 1135) and conquers Apulia from King Roger II of Sicily. Duke Grimoald of Bari, supported by Lothair III, rebels against Roger.
- December 14 – King Harald IV of Norway is murdered by Sigurd Slembe, an illegitimate son of the late King Magnus Barefoot. He is succeeded by his sons Inge I ("the Hunchback) and his 3-year-old half-brother Sigurd II.

==== Britain ====
- Spring – King David I of Scotland invades northern England and captures many of the major towns including Carlisle and Newcastle. In response, King Stephen raises an army (with Flemish mercenaries), and marches to Durham. David agrees to negotiate a peace between the two countries.
- February 5 – Treaty of Durham: A peace treaty is signed by Stephen and David I. The Scots are allowed to keep Carlisle and a part of Cumberland in return for stopping their advance. David refuses an oath of allegiance, as his loyalties rest with Matilda (daughter of the late King Henry I).
- October – Battle of Crug Mawr (Great Barrow): King Owain Gwynedd (styled "Prince of Wales") defeats the Norman and Flemish forces under Robert Fitz Martin, securing the control of Ceredigion (West Wales).

==== Africa ====
- The city of Béjaïa (modern Algeria) repels a Genoan naval assault.

==== Asia ====
- Sultan Mudzaffar Shah I establishes the Kedah Sultanate at Qodah Darul Aman (modern-day Kedah Darul Aman, Malaysia).

=== By topic ===
==== Arts and Culture ====
- The Basilica of Saint-Denis is completed to designs by Abbot Suger in Paris, France.
- Peter Abelard writes the Historia Calamitatum, detailing his relationship with Heloise.

==== Religion ====
- Hildegard of Bingen becomes abbess of the Benedictine monastery of Disibodenberg, upon the death of Jutta von Sponheim.
- Worship at the original Glasgow Cathedral in Scotland begins.
- Melrose Abbey (located in the Scottish Borders) is founded by Cistercian monks at the request of David.

== Births ==
- July 22 – William of Anjou, viscount of Dieppe (d. 1164)
- Amalric I (or Amalricus), king of Jerusalem (d. 1174)
- Humbert III (the Blessed), count of Savoy (d. 1189)
- Ismail al-Jazari, Artuqid polymath and inventor (d. 1206)
- Marie I (or Mary), countess consort of Boulogne (d. 1182)
- William of Newburgh, English historian and writer (d. 1198)
- Xia (Shenfu), Chinese empress consort (d. 1167)

== Deaths ==
- April 15 – Richard Fitz Gilbert de Clare, Norman nobleman
- May 24 – Hugues de Payens, French nobleman and knight
- November 15 – Leopold III, margrave of Austria (b. 1073)
- November 21 – William de Corbeil, archbishop of Canterbury
- December 14 – Harald IV (Servant of Christ), king of Norway
- Abraham bar Hiyya, Spanish mathematician and astronomer
- Jutta von Sponheim, German noblewoman and abbes (b. 1091)
- Gwenllian ferch Gruffydd, Welsh princess of Deheubarth
- Mael Isa Mac Mael Coluim, Irish monk and chronologist
- Wanyan Zonghan, Chinese nobleman and general (b. 1080)
- William VI, count of Auvergne and Velay (b. 1096)
- Zayn al-Din Gorgani, Persian physician (b. 1041)

== Sources ==
- Kleinhenz, Christopher (2010). Medieval Italy: an encyclopedia. Routledge. p. 95. ISBN 978-0-415-93930-0.
- Meynier, Gilbert (2010). L'Algérie cœur du Maghreb classique. De l'ouverture islamo-arabe au repli (658-1518) (in French). Paris: La Découverte. p. 86. ISBN 978-2707152312.
