= 1133 =

1133 in various calendars
- Gregorian calendar: 1133; MCXXXIII
- Ab urbe condita: 1886
- Armenian calendar: 582; ԹՎ ՇՁԲ
- Assyrian calendar: 5883
- Balinese saka calendar: 1054–1055
- Bengali calendar: 539–540
- Berber calendar: 2083
- English Regnal year: 33 Hen. 1 – 34 Hen. 1
- Buddhist calendar: 1677
- Burmese calendar: 495
- Byzantine calendar: 6641–6642
- Chinese calendar: 壬子年 (Water Rat); 3830 or 3623 — to — 癸丑年 (Water Ox); 3831 or 3624
- Coptic calendar: 849–850
- Discordian calendar: 2299
- Ethiopian calendar: 1125–1126
- Hebrew calendar: 4893–4894
- Hindu calendars
- Vikram Samvat: 1189–1190
- Shaka Samvat: 1054–1055
- Kali Yuga: 4233–4234
- Holocene calendar: 11133
- Igbo calendar: 133–134
- Iranian calendar: 511–512
- Islamic calendar: 527–528
- Japanese calendar: Chōshō 2 (長承２年)
- Javanese calendar: 1039–1040
- Julian calendar: 1133; MCXXXIII
- Korean calendar: 3466
- Minguo calendar: 779 before ROC 民前779年
- Nanakshahi calendar: −335
- Seleucid era: 1444/1445 AG
- Thai solar calendar: 1675–1676
- Tibetan calendar: ཆུ་ཕོ་བྱི་བ་ལོ་ (male Water-Rat); 1259 or 878 or 106 — to — ཆུ་མོ་གླང་ལོ་ (female Water-Ox); 1260 or 879 or 107

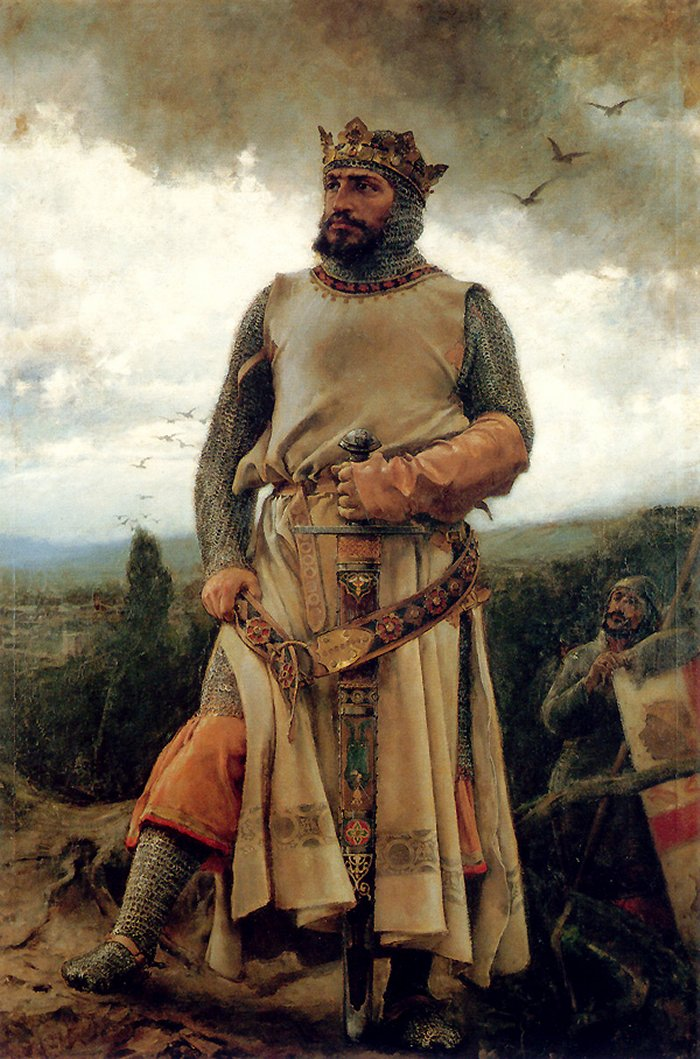
King Alfonso I (the Battler) of Aragon

Year 1133 (MCXXXIII) was a common year starting on Sunday of the Julian calendar.

== Events ==
=== By place ===
==== Europe ====
- Spring – A German expeditionary force, led by King Lothair III, marches into northern Italy, and arrives at Rome, after a 6-month journey across the Alps. Accompanied by Bernard of Clairvaux, French abbot and Doctor of the Church, Lothair is crowned by Pope Innocent II as Holy Roman Emperor at the Church of the Lateran, on June 4. He receives as papal fiefs the vast estates of Matilda, former margravine of Tuscany, which he secures for his daughter Gertrude of Süpplingenburg and her husband, Duke Henry X (the Proud) of Bavaria.
- July 17 – Battle of Fraga: The Castellan troops led by King Alfonso I (the Battler) defeat the Almoravid army, thanks to a timely intervention of a Norman Crusader army from Tarragona, led by Robert Bordet.
- Ramon Berenguer IV, count of Barcelona, launches a raid against Almoravid-held territories in Al-Andalus (modern Spain), and pillages the country all the way to Cádiz.

=== By topic ===
==== Religion ====
- The first convent on Iceland, the Þingeyraklaustur, is inaugurated at a monastery of the Order of Saint Benedict (located in Þingeyrar).
- Antipope Anacletus II forces Innocent II out of Rome following the departure of Lothair III. Innocent flees and takes a ship to Pisa.
- Geoffrey of Monmouth, an English cleric, writes the chronicle Historia Regum Britanniae.
- Rijnsburg Abbey is founded by Petronilla of Lorraine, countess and regent of Holland.
- Construction of the chapter house at Durham Cathedral which is completed in 1140.

== Births ==
- February 23 – Al-Zafir, Fatimid caliph (d. 1154)
- March 5 – Henry II (Curtmantle), king of England (d. 1189)
- May 13 – Hōnen, Japanese religious reformer (d. 1212)
- Abu al-Abbas al-Jarawi, Moroccan poet (d. 1212)
- Andronikos Doukas Angelos, Byzantine aristocrat
- Andronikos Kontostephanos, Byzantine aristocrat
- Blanche of Navarre, Queen of Castile (d.1156)
- Faidiva of Toulouse, countess of Savoy (d. 1154)
- Jean de Gisors, Norman nobleman (d. 1220)
- Ralph de Sudeley, English nobleman (d. 1192)
- Sigurd II (or Sigurd Munn), king of Norway (d. 1155)
- Stephen IV, king of Hungary and Croatia (d. 1165)
- Thorlak Thorhallsson, Icelandic bishop (d. 1193)
- Urraca of Castile, queen of Navarre (d. 1179)
- Zhang Shi, Chinese Confucian scholar (d. 1181)

== Deaths ==
- February 19 – Irene Doukaina, Byzantine empress (b. 1066)
- May 1 – Manegold von Mammern, German abbot
- December 4 – Bernard degli Uberti, Italian bishop
- December 18 – Hildebert, French hagiographer (b. 1055)
- December 21 – Guigues III (the Old), French nobleman
- Dirmicius of Regensburg, Irish monk and abbot
- Gregory of Catino, Italian monk and historian (b. 1060)
- þorlákur Runólfsson, Icelandic bishop (b. 1086)
- William of Zardana (or Saône), French nobleman

== Sources ==
- McGrank, Lawrence (1981). "Norman crusaders in the Catalan reconquest: Robert Burdet and the principality of Tarragona, 1129-55". Journal of Medieval History. 7 (1): 67–82. doi:10.1016/0304-4181(81)90036-1.
- Meynier, Gilbert (2010). L'Algérie cœur du Maghreb classique. De l'ouverture islamo-arabe au repli (658-1518) (in French). Paris: La Découverte. p. 86. ISBN 978-2707152312.
