= 1130 =

1130 in various calendars
- Gregorian calendar: 1130; MCXXX
- Ab urbe condita: 1883
- Armenian calendar: 579; ԹՎ ՇՀԹ
- Assyrian calendar: 5880
- Balinese saka calendar: 1051–1052
- Bengali calendar: 536–537
- Berber calendar: 2080
- English Regnal year: 30 Hen. 1 – 31 Hen. 1
- Buddhist calendar: 1674
- Burmese calendar: 492
- Byzantine calendar: 6638–6639
- Chinese calendar: 己酉年 (Earth Rooster); 3827 or 3620 — to — 庚戌年 (Metal Dog); 3828 or 3621
- Coptic calendar: 846–847
- Discordian calendar: 2296
- Ethiopian calendar: 1122–1123
- Hebrew calendar: 4890–4891
- Hindu calendars
- Vikram Samvat: 1186–1187
- Shaka Samvat: 1051–1052
- Kali Yuga: 4230–4231
- Holocene calendar: 11130
- Igbo calendar: 130–131
- Iranian calendar: 508–509
- Islamic calendar: 524–525
- Japanese calendar: Daiji 5 (大治５年)
- Javanese calendar: 1035–1036
- Julian calendar: 1130; MCXXX
- Korean calendar: 3463
- Minguo calendar: 782 before ROC 民前782年
- Nanakshahi calendar: −338
- Seleucid era: 1441/1442 AG
- Thai solar calendar: 1672–1673
- Tibetan calendar: ས་མོ་བྱ་ལོ་ (female Earth-Bird); 1256 or 875 or 103 — to — ལྕགས་ཕོ་ཁྱི་ལོ་ (male Iron-Dog); 1257 or 876 or 104

Year 1130 (MCXXX) was a common year starting on Wednesday of the Julian calendar.

== Events ==
- January 22 – Jin–Song Wars: Jin forces take Hangzhou.
- February 4 – Jin–Song Wars: Jin forces take Shaoxing.
- February 14 – Pope Innocent II succeeds Pope Honorius II, as the 164th pope. Other factions (including Roger II of Sicily), however, support Anacletus II as pope, leading to the papal schism of 1130, and Innocent flees to France.
- March 26 – Magnus IV and his uncle Harald Gille become joint kings of Norway, starting the civil war era in Norway.
- April 24 – Jin–Song Wars: Battle of Huangtiandang – Naval forces of the Song dynasty trap Wuzhu's Jin troops in the city for 48 days.
- December 25 – Antipope Anacletus crowns Roger II of Sicily king.
- Approximate date – Magnus the Strong is deposed as king of Götaland, when Sverker the Elder proclaims himself king of Sweden.

== Births ==
- Eustace IV of Boulogne, a Count of Boulogne and the son and heir of Stephen, King of England (approximate date; d. 1153)
- Daoji, Chinese Buddhist monk (d. 1207)
- Baldwin III of Jerusalem (d. 1162)
- Richard de Clare, 2nd Earl of Pembroke (d. 1176)
- Zhu Xi, Chinese Confucian scholar (d. 1200)

== Deaths ==
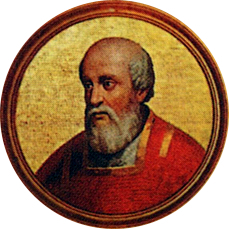
Pope Honorius II

- February 13 – Pope Honorius II (b. 1060)
- March 26 – King Sigurd I of Norway (b. c. 1090)
- October 16 – Pedro González de Lara, Castilian magnate
- November 11 – Teresa of León, Countess of Portugal, Portuguese regent (b. 1080)
- date unknown
  - Brahmadeva, Indian mathematician (b. 1060)
  - Maud, 2nd Countess of Huntingdon (b. 1074)
  - Robert of Bellême, 3rd Earl of Shrewsbury (b. 1052)
  - Alam al-Malika, Yemenite politician
  - Diemoth, German nun and writer (b. 1060) (approximately)
