= 1135 =

1135 in various calendars
- Gregorian calendar: 1135; MCXXXV
- Ab urbe condita: 1888
- Armenian calendar: 584; ԹՎ ՇՁԴ
- Assyrian calendar: 5885
- Balinese saka calendar: 1056–1057
- Bengali calendar: 541–542
- Berber calendar: 2085
- English Regnal year: 35 Hen. 1 – 1 Ste. 1
- Buddhist calendar: 1679
- Burmese calendar: 497
- Byzantine calendar: 6643–6644
- Chinese calendar: 甲寅年 (Wood Tiger); 3832 or 3625 — to — 乙卯年 (Wood Rabbit); 3833 or 3626
- Coptic calendar: 851–852
- Discordian calendar: 2301
- Ethiopian calendar: 1127–1128
- Hebrew calendar: 4895–4896
- Hindu calendars
- Vikram Samvat: 1191–1192
- Shaka Samvat: 1056–1057
- Kali Yuga: 4235–4236
- Holocene calendar: 11135
- Igbo calendar: 135–136
- Iranian calendar: 513–514
- Islamic calendar: 529–530
- Japanese calendar: Chōshō 4 / Hōen 1 (保延元年)
- Javanese calendar: 1041–1042
- Julian calendar: 1135; MCXXXV
- Korean calendar: 3468
- Minguo calendar: 777 before ROC 民前777年
- Nanakshahi calendar: −333
- Seleucid era: 1446/1447 AG
- Thai solar calendar: 1677–1678
- Tibetan calendar: ཤིང་ཕོ་སྟག་ལོ་ (male Wood-Tiger); 1261 or 880 or 108 — to — ཤིང་མོ་ཡོས་ལོ་ (female Wood-Hare); 1262 or 881 or 109

The Near East with the Crusader states

Year 1135 (MCXXXV) was a common year starting on Tuesday of the Julian calendar.

== Events ==
=== By place ===
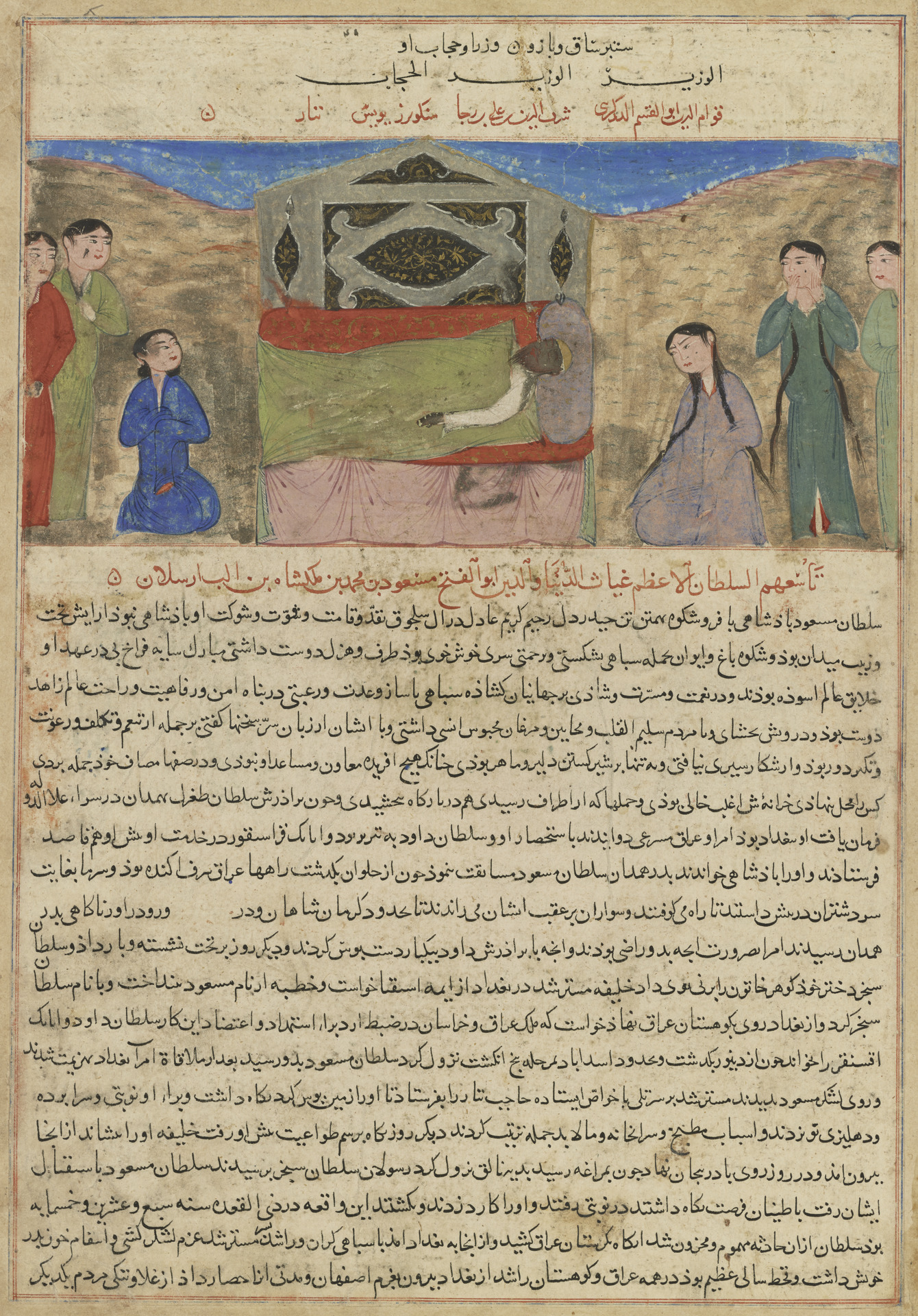
Assassination of Al-Mustarshid in 1135

==== Levant ====
- Spring – Shams al-Mulk Isma'il, Seljuk ruler of Damascus, sends envoys to Imad al-Din Zengi, Seljuk ruler of Mosul, to seek his protection in exchange of Damascus. Zengi crosses the Euphrates, receiving the surrender of the city of Hama. He besieges Damascus but, due to a shortage of supplies, is forced to abandon the siege. Zengi extricates himself from Damascus, his Seljuk forces capture the fortresses at Ma'arrat and Atharib.
- Queen Melisende of Jerusalem reconciles with her husband Fulk V, after a period of estrangement occasioned by her growing power, and rumors that she has had an affair with Hugh II (du Puiset), former count of Jaffa.

==== Europe ====
- January 7 – King Harald IV returns with Danish reinforcements and the support of King Eric II ("the Memorable"). He captures his nephew and joint ruler Magnus IV (Sigurdsson), who is blinded, castrated – and confined in Nidarholm Abbey (located on the island of Munkholmen).
- May 26 – King Alfonso VII is crowned as "Emperor of All Spain" (Imperator totius Hispaniae) in the Cathedral of León. The coronation is attended by Ramon Berenguer IV (his brother-in-law), Raymond V and other Spanish nobles who recognize him as their overlord.
- Summer – King Roger II lands with a Sicilian expeditionary force in Salerno. He splits his army, and conquers the cities of Aversa and Alife. Roger besieges Naples – but despite poor health conditions within the city, he is not able to take it, and returns again to Messina.
- August 15 – Emperor Lothair III receives homage from Eric II, and makes him an imperial prince at the Reichstag. His diplomatic missions to Hungary and Poland result in a tribute payment. Duke Bolesław III Wrymouth is given Pomerania and Rügen as German fiefs.
- Lothair III receives a Byzantine embassy at his court, on behalf of Emperor John II Komnenos. It offers large financial subsidies for Lothair to start a campaign against Roger II. The negotiations will last for some months.
- September – King García IV ("the Restorer") breaks with Alfonso VII, and makes common cause with the County of Portugal against Castile and León.
- October – Conrad III, duke of Franconia, gives up his title as King of Italy in opposition with Lothair III. He receives a pardon and recovers his estates.
- Pisans in the service of the Holy See (Diocese of Rome) sack the city of Amalfi.
- A Moorish fleet raids the Catalan port-town of Elna (Southern France).

==== England ====
- December 1 – King Henry I dies at Lyons-la-Forêt in Normandy after a 35-year reign. He is succeeded by his nephew Stephen of Blois (grandson of William the Conqueror), who asserts his claim to the throne in opposition to claims by Henry's daughter Matilda (prolonged in a civil war known as The Anarchy).
- December 26 – Stephen of Blois is crowned at Westminster Abbey in London by Archbishop William de Corbeil. Matilda (pregnant with child) and her husband Geoffrey V ("the Fair") leave for their own safety to Normandy, where she plans how to overthrow Stephen and claim the English throne for her own.

==== Middle East ====
- August 29 – Caliph Al-Mustarshid is assassinated at Baghdad after a 17-year reign. He is succeeded by his son Al-Rashid Billah as ruler of the Abbasid Caliphate (until 1138).

==== North Africa ====
- Summer – A Sicilian expeditionary force led by Roger II embarks from Messina and takes the island of Djerba (modern Tunisia).
- The Hammadid Emirate (modern Algeria) launches an assault against the city of Mahdia (modern Tunisia).

==== Asia ====
- Jin–Song War – Song forces under Yue Fei begin a counteroffensive against the Jurchen-ruled Jin dynasty in northern China. He defeats Jin forces, by entangling his paddle-wheel ships at the Huai River.
- June 4 – Emperor Hui Zong dies in exile in Heilongjiang (Manchuria), having been held prisoner with his son Qin Zong since their capture in 1127.

=== By topic ===
==== Religion ====
- January – Byland Abbey is founded in England by the Congregation of Savigny.
- May – Council of Pisa is convened by Innocent II. The council addressed simony, schismatic clerics, heresy, as well as donations to the Templar Order.
- Buildwas Abbey is founded in England by Roger de Clinton, bishop of Coventry.

== Births ==
- Abu Yaqub Yusuf, caliph of the Almohad Caliphate (d. 1184)
- Adachi Morinaga, Japanese warrior monk (d. 1200)
- Albert of Chiatina, Italian archpriest and saint (d. 1202)
- André of Brienne, French nobleman (approximate date)
- Bogumilus, archbishop of Gniezno (approximate date)
- Burhan al-Din al-Marghinani, Arabic Hanafi jurist (d. 1197)
- Conrad of Hohenstaufen, German nobleman (d. 1195)
- Fernando Afonso, Portuguese Grand Master (d. 1207)
- Gertrude of Flanders, countess of Savoy (d. 1186)
- Hafsa bint al-Hajj al-Rukuniyya, Andalusian poet (d. 1190)
- Henry Fitz Eylwin, 1st Lord Mayor of London (d. 1212)
- Herman IV, margrave of Baden and Verona (d. 1190)
- Hugh de Willoughby, English nobleman (d. 1205)
- Inge I ("the Hunchback"), king of Norway (d. 1161)
- Joachim of Fiore, Italian theologian and mystic (d. 1202)
- Karl Jónsson, Icelandic clergyman and poet (d. 1213)
- Magnus Haraldsson, king of Norway (approximate date)
- Maimonides, Almoravid philosopher and physician (d. 1204)
- Margaret of Navarre, queen of Sicily (approximate date)
- Minamoto no Yoshishige, Japanese samurai (d. 1202)
- Sharaf al-Dīn al-Tūsī, Persian mathematician (d. 1213)
- Simone Doria, Genoese admiral (approximate date)
- Roger de Newburgh, English nobleman (d. 1192)
- Rudolf of Zähringen, German archbishop (d. 1191)
- Samson of Tottington, English monk and abbot (d. 1211)
- Walkelin de Derby (or Ferrers), Norman nobleman (d. 1190)
- William of the White Hands, French archbishop (d. 1202)
- Xie (Xiaozong), Chinese empress of the Song dynasty (d. 1207)

== Deaths ==
- February 1 – Shams al-Mulk Isma'il, Seljuk ruler (b. 1113)
- February 6 – Elvira of Castile, queen of Sicily (b. 1100)
- February 9 – Taizong, emperor of the Jin dynasty (b. 1075)
- May – Rainier (or Renier), marquess of Montferrat (b. 1084)
- June 4 – Huizong, emperor of the Song dynasty (b. 1082)
- August 9 – Wartislaw I, duke of Pomerania (b. 1091)
- August 29 – Al-Mustarshid, Abbasid caliph (b. 1092)
- December 1 – Henry I, king of England (b. 1068)
- Abd al-Majid ibn Abdun, Andalusian poet (b. 1050)
- Gerald de Windsor, English nobleman (b. 1075)
- Gisela of Burgundy, marchioness of Montferrat, French noblewoman (b. 1075)
- Harald Kesja ("the Spear"), king of Denmark (b. 1080)
- Liang Hongyu ("Red Jade"), Chinese female general (b. 1102)
- Meginhard I, Count of Sponheim, German nobleman (approximate date)
- Yuanwu Keqin, Chinese Chan Buddhist monk (b. 1063)

== Sources ==
- Johns, Jeremy (2002). Arabic Administration in Norman Sicily: The Royal Diwan. Cambridge Studies in Islamic Civilization. Cambridge University Press. p. 85. ISBN 978-0521816922.
- McGrank, Lawrence (1981). "Norman crusaders in the Catalan reconquest: Robert Burdet and the principality of Tarragona, 1129-55". Journal of Medieval History. 7 (1): 67–82. doi:10.1016/0304-4181(81)90036-1.
- Picard, Christophe (1997). La mer et les musulmans d'occident au Moyen Âge, VIIIe-XIIIe siècle (in French). Presses Universitaires de France. ISBN 978-2130488101.
