= Abd al-Malik ibn Abd Allah Ibn Badrun =

Andalusian poet and scholar

ʻAbd al-Malik ibn ʻAbd Allāh Ibn Badrūn
- عبد الملك بن عبد الله بن بدرون
- Born: Al-Andalus
- Died: 1211
- Occupations: Poet, Scholar
- Writing career
- Language: Arabic
- Notable work: Sharḥ qaṣīdat Ibn ʻAbdūn

Abd al-Malik ibn Abd Allah Ibn Badrun (d. 1211 (Arabic: عبد الملك بن عبد الله بن بدرون)) was a poet and scholar from Al-Andalus.

== Career ==
He is known for his extensive commentary on the works of Ibn Abdun, a prominent poet of his time. The commentary is known as Sharḥ qaṣīdat Ibn ʻAbdūn.

== Literature ==
- Sharh Qasidat al-wazir al-katib fīl-adab wa-al-maratib li-AbīAbd al-Majid ibn Abdun, by Abd al-Malik ibn Abd Allah Ibn Badrun; Mahmud Hasan Shaybani; Abd al-Majid ibn Abd Allah Ibn Abdun, ed.: al-Riyad : M.H. al-Shaybanī, 1993.
- Abd al-Malik ibn Abd Allah Ibn Badrun, Sharh qasidat Ibn Abdun al-marufah bi-al-basamah fīal-tarikh wa-al-adab, Cairo: Mahbaat al-Saadah, 1921/22

== See also ==
- Abd al-Majid ibn Abdun
