= 1179 =

1179 in various calendars
- Gregorian calendar: 1179; MCLXXIX
- Ab urbe condita: 1932
- Armenian calendar: 628; ԹՎ ՈԻԸ
- Assyrian calendar: 5929
- Balinese saka calendar: 1100–1101
- Bengali calendar: 585–586
- Berber calendar: 2129
- English Regnal year: 25 Hen. 2 – 26 Hen. 2
- Buddhist calendar: 1723
- Burmese calendar: 541
- Byzantine calendar: 6687–6688
- Chinese calendar: 戊戌年 (Earth Dog); 3876 or 3669 — to — 己亥年 (Earth Pig); 3877 or 3670
- Coptic calendar: 895–896
- Discordian calendar: 2345
- Ethiopian calendar: 1171–1172
- Hebrew calendar: 4939–4940
- Hindu calendars
- Vikram Samvat: 1235–1236
- Shaka Samvat: 1100–1101
- Kali Yuga: 4279–4280
- Holocene calendar: 11179
- Igbo calendar: 179–180
- Iranian calendar: 557–558
- Islamic calendar: 574–575
- Japanese calendar: Jishō 3 (治承３年)
- Javanese calendar: 1086–1087
- Julian calendar: 1179; MCLXXIX
- Korean calendar: 3512
- Minguo calendar: 733 before ROC 民前733年
- Nanakshahi calendar: −289
- Seleucid era: 1490/1491 AG
- Thai solar calendar: 1721–1722
- Tibetan calendar: ས་ཕོ་ཁྱི་ལོ་ (male Earth-Dog); 1305 or 924 or 152 — to — ས་མོ་ཕག་ལོ་ (female Earth-Boar); 1306 or 925 or 153

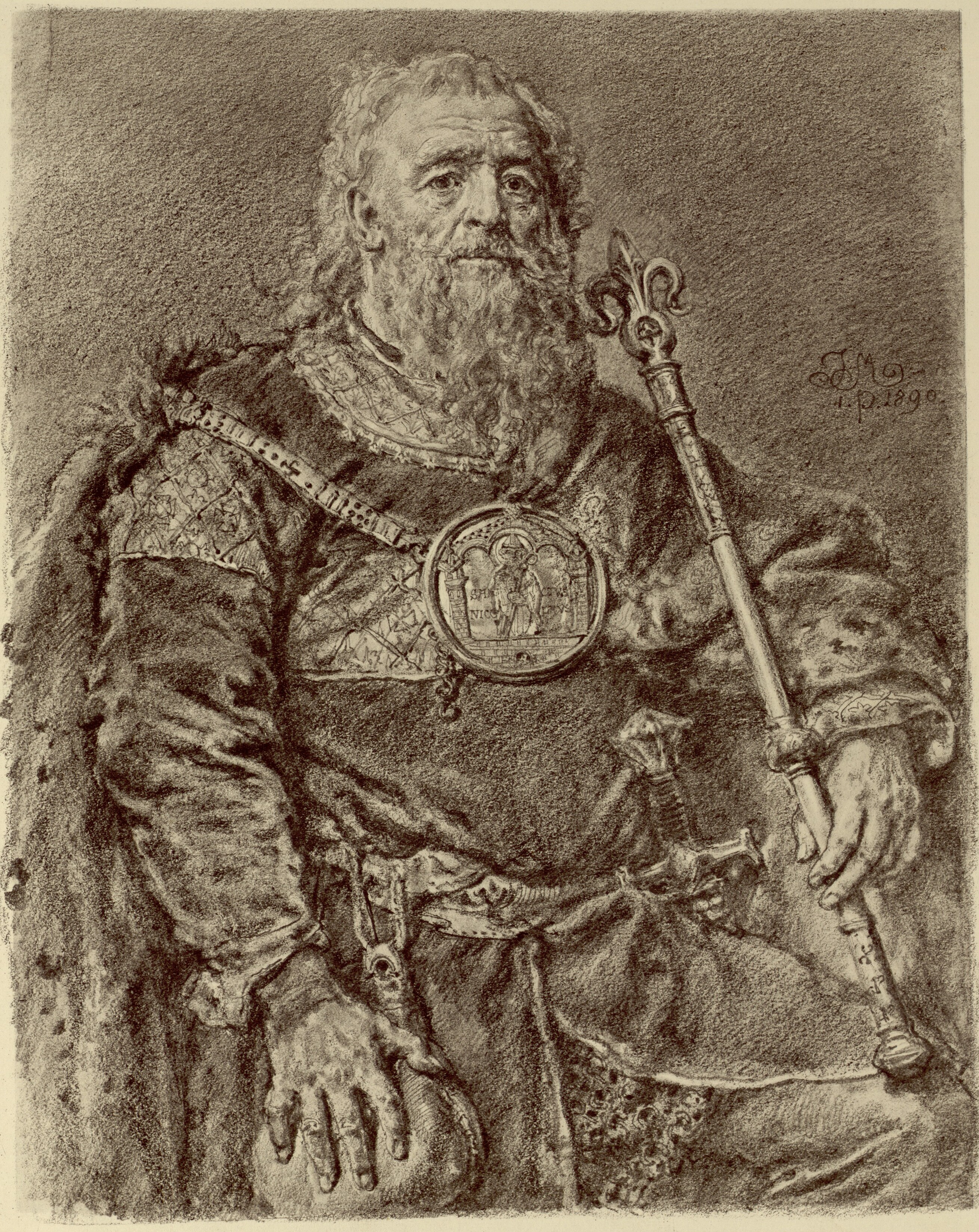
Mieszko III (the Old) (r. 1138–1202)

Year 1179 (MCLXXIX) was a common year starting on Monday of the Julian calendar.

== Events ==
=== By place ===
==== Levant ====
- April 10 – A Crusader army, led by King Baldwin IV of Jerusalem ("the Leper"), is ambushed by Muslim forces in a narrow valley in the forest of Banyas. Baldwin is only able to extricate his forces owing to the heroism of Humphrey II, lord of Toron, who holds up the Muslims with his bodyguard till Baldwin and his army escape. Humphrey suffers mortal wounds and dies on April 22. He is succeeded by his 13-year-old grandson Humphrey IV.
- June 10 – Battle of Marj Ayyun: A Crusader army (some 10,000 men) led by Baldwin IV is defeated by Muslim forces under Saladin near the Litani River (modern Lebanon). The Knights Templar join the battle, but they are driven back in confusion. Baldwin narrowly escapes being captured in the route. Amongst Saladin's prisoners are Odo de St. Amand, Grand Master of the Templars, and Lord Baldwin of Ibelin.
- August 30 – Siege of Jacob's Ford: Muslim forces led by Saladin conquer and destroy the unfinished Castle of Chastellet at Jacob's Ford, killing 80 knights and taking 700 civilians captive.

==== Europe ====
- June 18 – Battle of Kalvskinnet: Norwegian forces led by King Sverre Sigurdsson defeat and kill Earl Erling Skakke, outside Nidaros in Norway. The battle changes the tide of the civil wars.
- June 24 – Henry the Lion, duke of Saxony, is put under the ban of the empire when he refuses to appear before Emperor Frederick I (Barbarossa) to answer charges of misgovernment.
- Summer – Afonso I (the Conqueror) is recognized as King of Portugal by Pope Alexander III – bringing Portugal the protection of the Catholic Church against the Leonese monarchy.
- Mieszko III (the Old), duke of Poland, travels to Germany to ask Frederick I to offer help in his restoration of the Polish throne, but Frederick demands a payment of 10,000 silver.
- November 1 – The 14-year-old Philip II is crowned at Rheims by Archbishop William of the White Hands. He becomes joint ruler of France, together with his father King Louis VII.
- King William I (the Lion) establishes two castles at the Beauly Firth and the Cromarty Firth in northern Scotland. On his return, the city of Aberdeen is chartered by Wiliam.

==== England ====
- Summer – Richard de Luci (or Lucy), High Sheriff of Essex, resigns his judicial office. He enters Lesnes Abbey (near London) that he founded in Kent, as penance for his part in the events leading to the murder of Thomas Becket (see 1170). Richard dies there on July 14.

==== Africa ====
- September 17 – A large offensive, by the Almohad army led by Yusuf I in southern Portugal, aims at the reconquest of the Alentejo. Further north, an Almohad fleet sails to attack Lisbon, but is repelled by the Portuguese, near the Cape Espichel. The Portuguese fleet later manages to enter in the harbour of Ceuta, and destroy a number of Muslim ships. It is the beginning of a four-year naval conflict between the Almohads and Portuguese.

==== Asia ====
- Taira no Kiyomori, Japanese military leader, confines the former Emperor Go-Shirakawa to his quarters after discovering that he has tried to confiscate the estates of Kiyomori's deceased children.

==== Mesoamerica ====
- The Maya city Chichen Itza is sacked and burned by Hunac Ceel, ruler of Mayapan (approximate date).

=== By topic ===
==== Religion ====
- March – Third Council of the Lateran: The Council condemns Waldensians and Cathars as heretics. It further institutes a reformation of clerical life and regulates that in order to prevent future schisms, the pope must receive 2/3 of the cardinals' votes to be elected.
- September 17 – Hildegard of Bingen, German abbess and polymath, dies at Rupertsberg. Having founded two monasteries, she has also written theological, botanical, and medicinal texts.
- Westminster School is founded by Benedictine monks of Westminster Abbey (by papal command) in England.
- A synod of thirty-three Armenian bishops in Hromkla discusses the conditions for union with the Byzantine Church and sends a profession of faith to emperor Manuel I Komnenos who dies before receiving it.
- The Drigung Kagyu school of Kagyu Buddhism is founded (approximate date).

== Births ==
- April 4 – Fariduddin Ganjshakar, Indian preacher (d. 1266)
- May 13 – Theobald III, count of Champagne (d. 1201)
- May 17 – Ogasawara Nagatsune, Japanese warrior (d. 1247)
- Constance of Aragon, Holy Roman Empress (d. 1222)
- Donatus of Ripacandida, Italian monk and saint (d. 1198)
- John of Ibelin, the Old Lord of Beirut, constable (d. 1236)
- Konoe Iezane, Japanese nobleman and monk (d. 1243)
- Shimazu Tadahisa, Japanese warlord (d. 1227)
- Serapion of Algiers, English priest and martyr (d. 1240)
- Snorri Sturluson, Icelandic historian and poet (d. 1241)
- William IV of Ponthieu ("Talvas"), Norman nobleman (d. 1221)
- Yaqut al-Hamawi, Arab geographer and writer (d. 1229)

== Deaths ==
- February 25 – Adelelm, English Lord High Treasurer
- April 22 – Humphrey II, constable and lord of Toron (b. 1117)
- June 18 – Erling Skakke, Norwegian nobleman (b. 1115)
- July 14 – Richard de Luci, Norman High Sheriff (b. 1089)
- July 27 – Mudzaffar Shah I, ruler of the Kedah Sultanate
- August 9 – Roger of Worcester, English bishop (b. 1118)
- August 20 – William le Gros (la Gras), English nobleman
- September 2 – Taira no Shigemori, Japanese nobleman (b. 1138)
- September 17 – Hildegard of Bingen, German abbess (b. 1098)
- October 9 – Odo de St. Amand, French Grand Master (b. 1110)
- October 18 – Chŏng Chung-bu, Korean military leader (b. 1106)
- December 25 – Roger de Bailleul, French monk and abbot
- Fujiwara no Atsuyori (or Dōin), Japanese waka poet (b. 1090)
- Guihomar IV (or Guidomar), Breton nobleman (b. 1130)
- Reginald de Warenne (or Rainald), Norman nobleman
- Urraca of Castile (Alfonso), queen of Navarre (b. 1133)
