= 1080 =

1080 in various calendars
- Gregorian calendar: 1080; MLXXX
- Ab urbe condita: 1833
- Armenian calendar: 529; ԹՎ ՇԻԹ
- Assyrian calendar: 5830
- Balinese saka calendar: 1001–1002
- Bengali calendar: 486–487
- Berber calendar: 2030
- English Regnal year: 14 Will. 1 – 15 Will. 1
- Buddhist calendar: 1624
- Burmese calendar: 442
- Byzantine calendar: 6588–6589
- Chinese calendar: 己未年 (Earth Goat); 3777 or 3570 — to — 庚申年 (Metal Monkey); 3778 or 3571
- Coptic calendar: 796–797
- Discordian calendar: 2246
- Ethiopian calendar: 1072–1073
- Hebrew calendar: 4840–4841
- Hindu calendars
- Vikram Samvat: 1136–1137
- Shaka Samvat: 1001–1002
- Kali Yuga: 4180–4181
- Holocene calendar: 11080
- Igbo calendar: 80–81
- Iranian calendar: 458–459
- Islamic calendar: 472–473
- Japanese calendar: Jōryaku 4 (承暦４年)
- Javanese calendar: 984–985
- Julian calendar: 1080; MLXXX
- Korean calendar: 3413
- Minguo calendar: 832 before ROC 民前832年
- Nanakshahi calendar: −388
- Seleucid era: 1391/1392 AG
- Thai solar calendar: 1622–1623
- Tibetan calendar: ས་མོ་ལུག་ལོ་ (female Earth-Sheep); 1206 or 825 or 53 — to — ལྕགས་ཕོ་སྤྲེ་ལོ་ (male Iron-Monkey); 1207 or 826 or 54

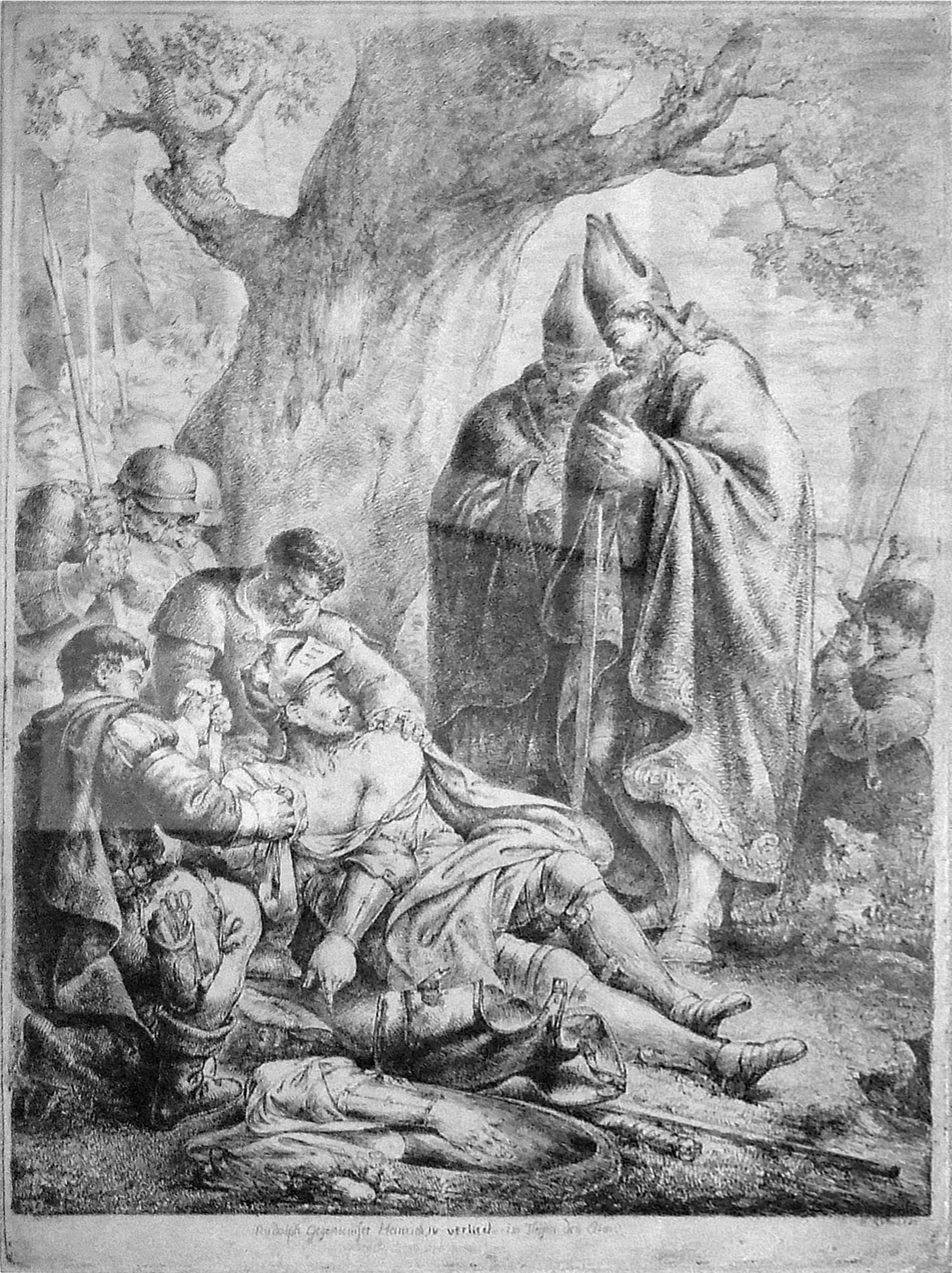
Rudolf of Rheinfelden loses his arm in combat during the Battle on the Elster.

Year 1080 (MLXXX) was a leap year starting on Wednesday of the Julian calendar.

== Events ==
=== By place ===
==== Byzantine Empire ====
- Autumn – Nikephoros Melissenos, a Byzantine general and aristocrat, seizes control of what remains of Byzantine Asia Minor (modern Turkey), and proclaims himself emperor against Nikephoros III Botaneiates. Melissenos makes an alliance with Sultan Suleiman ibn Qutulmish and recruits many Turkish mercenaries to his army.

==== Europe ====
- January 27 – Battle of Flarchheim: Henry IV, Holy Roman Emperor, defeats the forces led by the German anti-king Rudolf of Rheinfelden, duke of Swabia, near the town of Flarchheim (modern Germany).
- April 17 – King Harald III of Denmark dies after a 4-year reign and is buried at Dalby Church in Scania (modern Sweden). He is succeeded by his brother Canute IV ("the Holy") as ruler of Denmark.
- October 14 – Battle on the Elster: Rudolf of Rheinfelden defeats the imperial forces led by Henry IV at the Elster River. Rudolf dies the following day at Merseburg of wounds received.

==== Britain ====
- May 14 – Walcher, bishop of Durham, is killed by rebel Northumbrians. King William the Conqueror sends a punitive expedition led by his half-brother Odo of Bayeux to pacify Northumbria.
- Autumn – Robert Curthose, a son of William I, is sent to invade Scotland. He reaches as far as Falkirk and forces King Malcolm III to agree to terms while building fortifications at Newcastle upon Tyne.
- Osmund, bishop of Salisbury, builds Devizes Castle in Wiltshire.

==== Armenia ====
- The Rubenid Principality of Cilicia gains independence after its founder, Ruben I, succeeds in establishing his authority in the mountainous regions of Cilicia.

==== Africa ====
- The Almoravid emir, Yusuf ibn Tashfin, conquers Tangier, Badis and Hunayn.

==== China ====
- Shen Kuo, Chinese polymath scientist and statesman, begins his defensive military campaign against the Tangut people of the Western Xia. He successfully defends the invasion route to Yanzhou (Shaanxi province).

=== By topic ===
==== Religion ====
- June 25 – Wibert of Ravenna is elected as Antipope Clement III during the pro-imperial Synod of Brixen. Pope Gregory VII is deposed, signed in a decree by Henry IV.
- King Alfonso VI ("the Brave") of León and Castile establishes Latin liturgy in the Catholic Church, in place of the Hispanic Rite.
- Benno II, bishop of Osnabrück, founds the Benedictine abby of Iburg Castle (modern Germany).

== Births ==
(many dates approximate)

- Adelard of Bath, English philosopher (d. 1152)
- Alberic of Ostia, French cardinal-bishop (d. 1148)
- Barthélemy de Jur, French bishop
- Cellach of Armagh (or Celsus), Irish archbishop (d. 1129)
- Egas Moniz o Aio, Portuguese nobleman (d. 1146)
- Eilika of Saxony, German noblewoman (d. 1142)
- Ermesinde of Luxembourg, countess of Namur (d. 1143)
- Guarinus of Palestrina, Italian cardinal-bishop (d. 1158)
- Harald Kesja ("the Spear"), king of Denmark (d. 1135)
- Helie of Burgundy, countess of Toulouse (d. 1141)
- Henry I, archbishop of Mainz
- Honorius Augustodunensis, French theologian (d. 1154)
- Ibn Tumart, Almoravid political leader
- Leo I, prince of Cilician Armenia
- Lhachen Utpala, Indian king of Ladakh (d. 1110)
- Magnus Erlendsson, Norse earl of Orkney (d. 1115)
- María Rodríguez de Vivar, countess of Barcelona (d. 1105)
- Matilda of Scotland, queen consort of England (d. 1118)
- Piotr Włostowic, Polish nobleman
- Reginald I ("the One-Eyed"), count of Bar (d. 1149)
- Richard Fitz Pons, Norman nobleman (d. 1129)
- Robert Pullen, English cardinal
- Rotrou III ("the Great"), French nobleman (d. 1144)
- Theresa, Portuguese queen and regent (d. 1130)
- Wanyan Zonghan, Chinese nobleman (d. 1136)
- Wulfric of Haselbury, English wonderworker (d. 1154)

== Deaths ==
- January 26 – Amadeus II, count of Savoy (b. 1050)
- April 17 – Harald III, king of Denmark (b. 1040)
- May 14 – Walcher, bishop of Durham
- July 5 – Ísleifur Gissurarson, Icelandic bishop (b. 1006)
- October 15 – Rudolf of Rheinfelden, duke of Swabia
- Abraham, bishop of St David's (Wales) (murdered: approximate date)
- Aristakes Lastivertsi, Armenian historian (b. 1002)
- Bertha of Blois, duchess of Brittany (approximate date)
- Haakon Ivarsson, Norwegian jarl (b. 1027)
- Lhachen Gyalpo, Indian king of Ladakh (b. 1050)
- Michael Attaleiates, Byzantine historian and writer
- Muhammad ibn Abbas, ruler of the Ghurid dynasty
