= Conon of Naso =

Italian Roman Catholic saint

Saint Conon
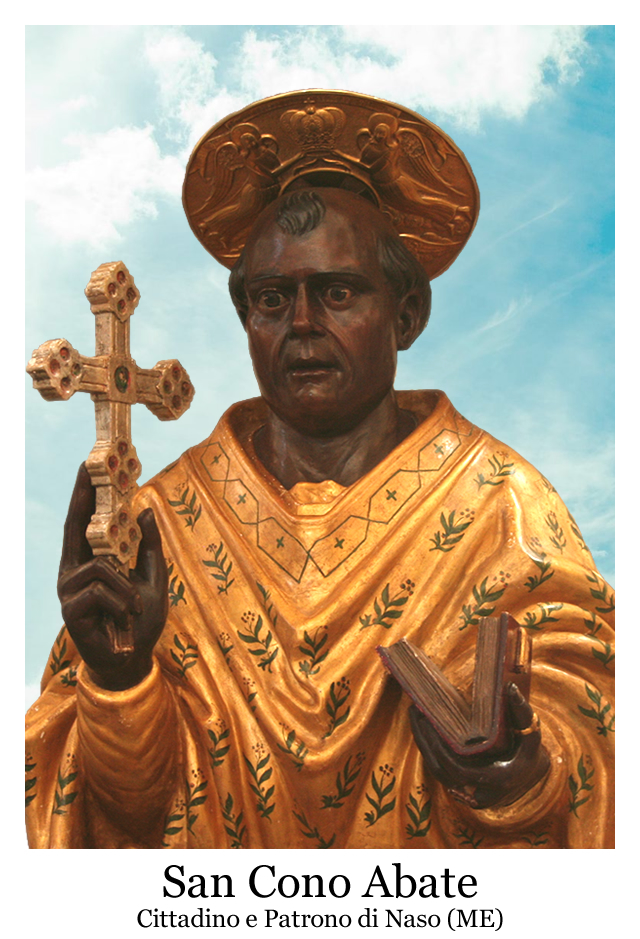
- Simulacrum of the Patron Saint of Naso
- Born: 3 June 1139; Naso, Sicily, Italy
- Died: 28 March 1236; Naso, Sicily, Italy
- Venerated in: Roman Catholic Church; Eastern Orthodox Churches
- Feast: 28 March
- Patronage: Naso, Italy

Conon (3 June 1139 – 28 March 1236) was a Basilian abbot at Naso, Sicily.

== Religious life ==
A famous tale from the life of Conon tells that he made a pilgrimage to Jerusalem, and whilst there he received a vision. In this vision, Conon witnessed a priest he knew being suffocated by a snake. After returning from the Holy Land, he went directly to this priest and told him what he had seen. The priest at once confessed to Conon that he was taking church funds and keeping them for himself. Conon then persuaded his fellow priest to change his ways. Another tale tells of how Conon healed a Sicilian boy of his apoplexy.

== Legacy and veneration ==
In 1571, Naso was in the midst of a dire famine. The people of the city prayed for the intercession of Conon, their patron. Conon then appeared to a ship captain, who brought grain to Naso, and thus the people of Naso survived the famine.

== Sources ==
- St. Conon. Catholic Online.
