= 1082 =

1082 in various calendars
- Gregorian calendar: 1082; MLXXXII
- Ab urbe condita: 1835
- Armenian calendar: 531; ԹՎ ՇԼԱ
- Assyrian calendar: 5832
- Balinese saka calendar: 1003–1004
- Bengali calendar: 488–489
- Berber calendar: 2032
- English Regnal year: 16 Will. 1 – 17 Will. 1
- Buddhist calendar: 1626
- Burmese calendar: 444
- Byzantine calendar: 6590–6591
- Chinese calendar: 辛酉年 (Metal Rooster); 3779 or 3572 — to — 壬戌年 (Water Dog); 3780 or 3573
- Coptic calendar: 798–799
- Discordian calendar: 2248
- Ethiopian calendar: 1074–1075
- Hebrew calendar: 4842–4843
- Hindu calendars
- Vikram Samvat: 1138–1139
- Shaka Samvat: 1003–1004
- Kali Yuga: 4182–4183
- Holocene calendar: 11082
- Igbo calendar: 82–83
- Iranian calendar: 460–461
- Islamic calendar: 474–475
- Japanese calendar: Eihō 2 (永保２年)
- Javanese calendar: 986–987
- Julian calendar: 1082; MLXXXII
- Korean calendar: 3415
- Minguo calendar: 830 before ROC 民前830年
- Nanakshahi calendar: −386
- Seleucid era: 1393/1394 AG
- Thai solar calendar: 1624–1625
- Tibetan calendar: ལྕགས་མོ་བྱ་ལོ་ (female Iron-Bird); 1208 or 827 or 55 — to — ཆུ་ཕོ་ཁྱི་ལོ་ (male Water-Dog); 1209 or 828 or 56

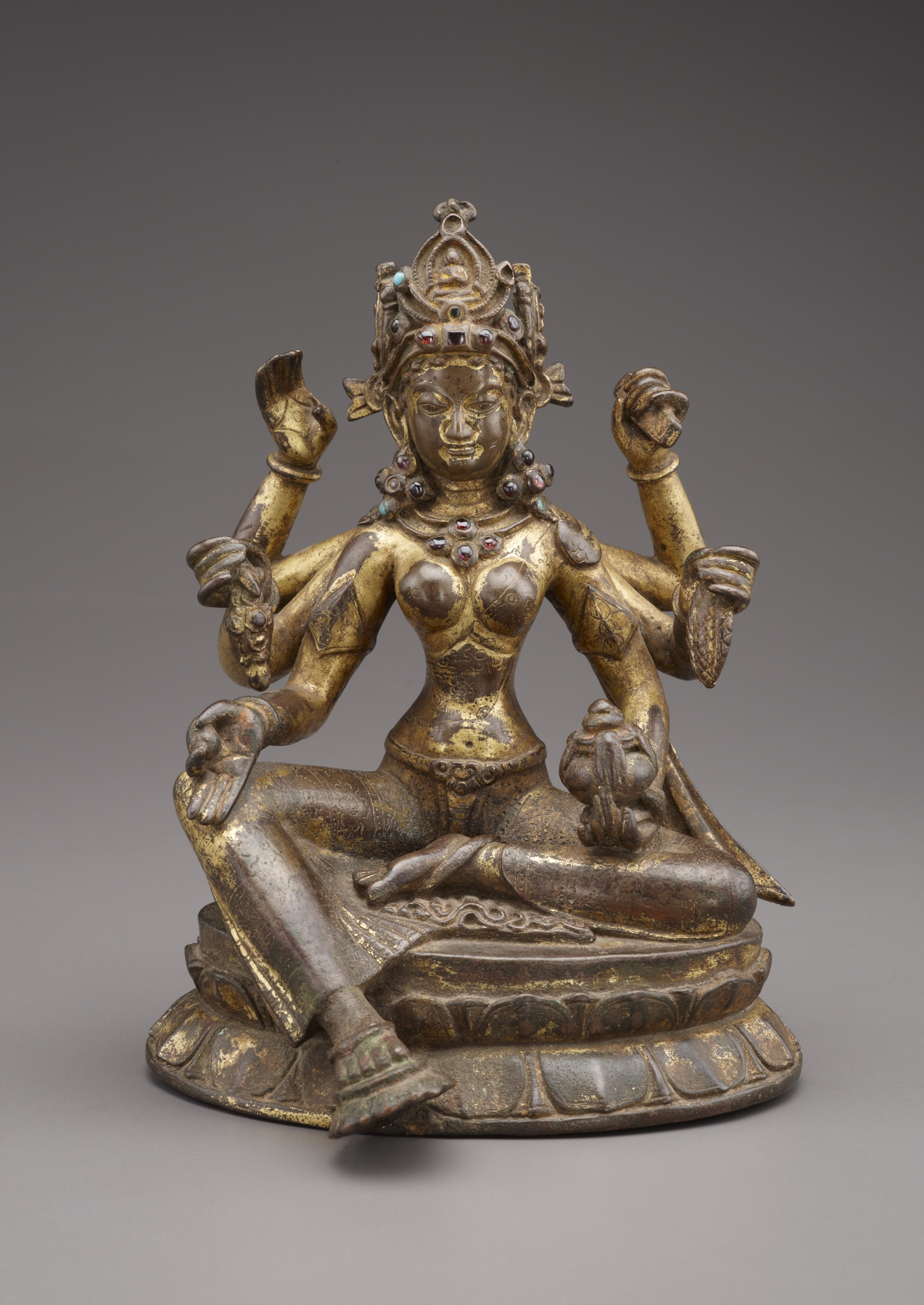
Vasudhara, Goddess of Abundance. Statue from Nepal dated 1082. Arthur M. Sackler Gallery

Year 1082 (MLXXXII) was a common year starting on Saturday of the Julian calendar.

== Events ==
=== By place ===
==== Byzantine Empire ====
- Spring – The Normans under Duke Robert Guiscard take Dyrrhachium (modern-day Durrës) in Illyria and advance inland, capturing most of Macedonia and Thessaly. Robert is forced to leave Greece to deal with an uprising in Italy. He leaves his son Bohemond in charge of the army, who lays siege to the city of Larissa. Emperor Alexios I Komnenos mobilizes a new army, and with the support of 7,000 Seljuk Turks he clears Thessaly from the Normans.
- Byzantine–Venetian treaty: Alexios I signs a trade and defence pact with Venice, in the form of an imperial Golden Bull. He grants the Venetians a commercial colony in Constantinople, as well as free trading and exemption from taxes, throughout the Byzantine Empire in return for their defense of the Adriatic Sea against the Normans.

==== Europe ====
- May 12 – Battle of Mailberg: Duke Vratislaus II of Bohemia invades Austria with an army of 8,000 men (supported by mercenaries from Moravia and Bavaria). He defeats the forces under Margrave Leopold II ("the Fair") near Mailberg. The northern region of Lower Austria is devastated from pillage and famine.
- December 6 – Count Ramon Berenguer II of Barcelona is killed while hunting in the woods. He is succeeded by his twin brother Berenguer Ramon II as the sole ruler of Catalonia (modern Spain).
- Winter – Henry IV, Holy Roman Emperor, leads an expedition into Italy and besieges Rome. He gains entry and a synod is agreed upon by the Romans to rule on the dispute between Henry and Pope Gregory VII.
- Adalbero, margrave of Styria, is forced to resign in favor of his brother Ottokar II, who is an ally of Gregory VII.
- The first mention of the town of Hofgeismar (modern Germany) is recorded.

==== Asia ====
- Approximate date – The Korean printing of the entire Buddhist Tripiṭaka is completed.

=== By topic ===
==== Religion ====
- Construction of the Rochester Cathedral is completed in England.

== Births ==
- June 7 – Huizong, emperor of the Song dynasty (d. 1135)
- November 11 – Ramon Berenguer III, count of Barcelona (d. 1132)
- Goswin of Anchin, French Benedictine monk and abbot (d. 1165)
- Mary of Scotland, countess of Boulogne (d. 1116)
- Minamoto no Yoshikuni, Japanese samurai (d. 1155)
- Muhammad I Tapar, sultan of the Seljuk Empire (d. 1118)
- Yaropolk II Vladimirovich, Grand Prince of Kiev (d. 1139)
- Approximate date
  - Petronilla of Lorraine, countess and regent of Holland (d. 1144)
  - Theotonius of Coimbra, Portuguese royal advisor (d. 1162)
  - Ulrich of Attems, Italian nobleman

== Deaths ==
- April 2/3 (or 1081) – Bolesław II the Bold, king of Poland
- December 5 – Ramon Berenguer II, count of Barcelona
- Arsen Ninotsmindeli, Georgian bishop and calligrapher
- David of Munktorp, English Cluniac monk and abbot
- Lothair Udo II, margrave of the Nordmark
- Waleran I (or Walram), count of Arlon and Limburg
- Approximate date – Robert de Grandmesnil, Norman nobleman
