= 1063 =

1063 in various calendars
- Gregorian calendar: 1063; MLXIII
- Ab urbe condita: 1816
- Armenian calendar: 512; ԹՎ ՇԺԲ
- Assyrian calendar: 5813
- Balinese saka calendar: 984–985
- Bengali calendar: 469–470
- Berber calendar: 2013
- English Regnal year: N/A
- Buddhist calendar: 1607
- Burmese calendar: 425
- Byzantine calendar: 6571–6572
- Chinese calendar: 壬寅年 (Water Tiger); 3760 or 3553 — to — 癸卯年 (Water Rabbit); 3761 or 3554
- Coptic calendar: 779–780
- Discordian calendar: 2229
- Ethiopian calendar: 1055–1056
- Hebrew calendar: 4823–4824
- Hindu calendars
- Vikram Samvat: 1119–1120
- Shaka Samvat: 984–985
- Kali Yuga: 4163–4164
- Holocene calendar: 11063
- Igbo calendar: 63–64
- Iranian calendar: 441–442
- Islamic calendar: 454–456
- Japanese calendar: Kōhei 6 (康平６年)
- Javanese calendar: 966–967
- Julian calendar: 1063; MLXIII
- Korean calendar: 3396
- Minguo calendar: 849 before ROC 民前849年
- Nanakshahi calendar: −405
- Seleucid era: 1374/1375 AG
- Thai solar calendar: 1605–1606
- Tibetan calendar: ཆུ་ཕོ་སྟག་ལོ་ (male Water-Tiger); 1189 or 808 or 36 — to — ཆུ་མོ་ཡོས་ལོ་ (female Water-Hare); 1190 or 809 or 37

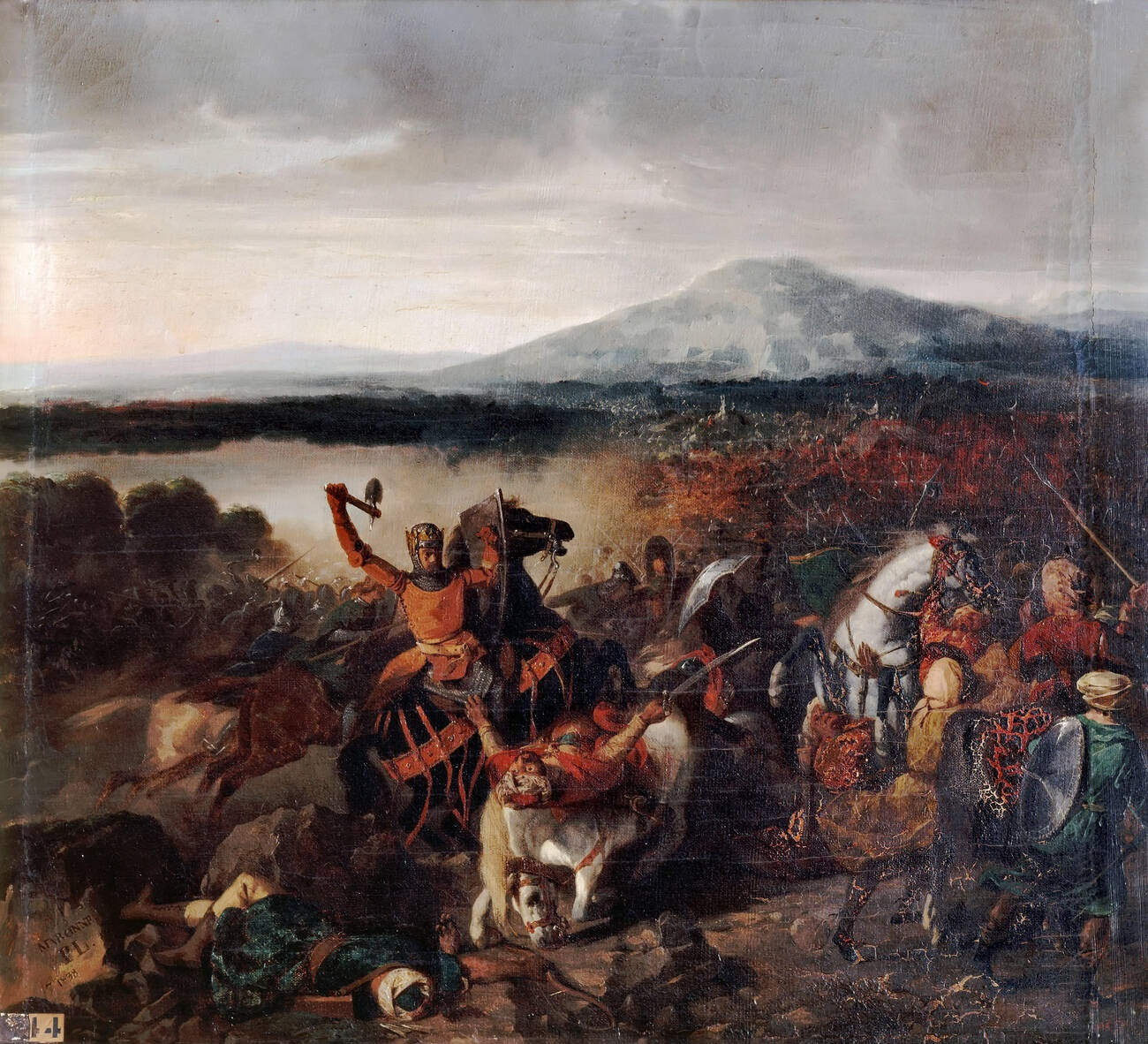
Duke Roger I defeats the Saracens at the Battle of Cerami (near Troina) in Sicily.

Year 1063 (MLXIII) was a common year starting on Wednesday of the Julian calendar.

== Events ==
=== By place ===
==== Europe ====
- May 8 – Battle of Graus: Allied Muslim and Christian troops, under King Sancho II (the Strong) and Emir Ahmad al-Muqtadir (maybe led by El Cid), defeat the Aragonese army. King Ramiro I is killed and succeeded by his son Sancho V, as ruler of Aragon.
- Battle of Cerami: Duke Roger I leads a small Norman force (supported by 136 mounted knights), and defeats a much larger Saracen army (35,000 men) at Cerami (near Troina) in Sicily.
- Summer – The Pisan fleet assaults and sacks Palermo (controlled by the Saracens) – this in support of the Norman forces of Roger I.
- August–September: The Holy Roman Empire invades Hungary and installs Solomon as their proxy ruler.
- Duke William I (the Bastard) claims the province of Maine and betroths his son Robert to Margaret, daughter of late Count Herbert II.

==== Seljuk Empire ====
- Battle of Damghan: Seljuk forces under Alp Arslan defeat his brother Qutalmish who claims the throne of late Tughril, founder of the Seljuk Empire. Qutalmish flees from the battle, but his son Suleiman is taken prisoner.

=== By topic ===
==== Architecture ====
- The Pizhi Pagoda located at Lingyan Temple (Shandong province) in China is completed, standing at a height of 54 m (177 ft) tall.
- Doge Domenico I orders the construction of the present building of St Mark's Basilica at Venice (approximate date).

==== Religion ====
- Anselm, later to become archbishop of Canterbury, becomes prior at the Abbey of Bec (approximate date).
- The bishopric of Olomouc (located on the River Morava) is founded (modern Czech Republic).

== Births ==
- Eight Deer Jaguar Claw (or 8 Deer), Mixtec ruler (d. 1115)
- Yuanwu Keqin, Chinese Chan Buddhist monk (d. 1135)

== Deaths ==
- March 21 – Richeza of Lotharingia, queen of Poland
- April 30 – Ren Zong, emperor of the Song dynasty (b. 1010)
- May 8 – Ramiro I, king of Aragon (House of Jiménez)
- August 5 – Gruffydd ap Llywelyn, king of Gwynedd
- August 9 – Constantine III, Byzantine patriarch
- September 3 – Henry II, archbishop of Augsburg
- September 4 – Tughril, sultan of the Seljuk Empire (b. 990)
- September 11 – Béla I (the Champion), king of Hungary
- December 7 – Qutalmish, prince of the Seljuk Empire
- Gotebald (or Gotebold), patriarch of Aquileia
- Hedwig (or Advisa), countess of Nevers
- Hilduin IV, count of Montdidier and Roucy
- Pang Ji, Chinese official and chancellor (b. 988)
- Sudislav Vladimirovich, prins of Pskov
- Sylvester III, pope of the Catholic Church
