= Siege of Shaizar =

Shaizar was besieged multiple times.

- Siege of Shaizar (1138)
- Siege of Shaizar (1157)
