= Mael Isa Mac Mael Coluim =

Mael Isa Mac Mael Coluim (died Good Friday, 1136) was described upon his death on 27 March 1136 as "chief keeper of the calendar of Ard-Macha, its chief antiquary and librarian". By the 19th century the surname appears to have been rendered as McCollum.

The Abbot of Armagh at this time was Niall mac Áeda meic Máel Ísu, a member of the Clann Sinaig, while the Archbishop of Armagh was Máel Máedóc Ua Morgair.

== See also ==
- Padraic Colum
- Irish calendar
