= Brahmadeva =

Indian mathematician (1060–1130)

- Born: c. 1060
- Died: 1130
- Known for: Trigonometry
- Awards: Noble
- Scientific career
- Fields: Mathematician

Brahmadeva (c. 1060–1130) was an Indian mathematician. He was the author of Karanaprakasa, which is a commentary on Aryabhata's Aryabhatiya. Its contents deal partly with trigonometry and its applications to astronomy.
