= Abu al-Abbas al-Jarawi =

Almohad writer

Abu al-Abbas Ahmad Ibn Abd as-Salam al-Jarawi (Arabic: أبو عباس الجراوي) (1133-1212) was the official poet of the Almohad dynasty. He published his poems in a diwan. Ibn Idhari quotes 300 lines by Al-Jarawi in his Al-Bayan al-Mughrib. Little is known of him, except that he came from the Zenata tribe.

== Notes and references ==
- H. Shabihi Husni, Abu al-'Abbas al-Jarawi:528-609 h. 1133-1212 m, 1986.
