= Abbès =

Abbès is a surname. Notable people with the surname Abbès or Abbes include:

- Alaeddine Abbes – Tunisian footballer
- Claude Abbes – French association football player (1927-2008)
- Emira Abbes – German curler
- Frédéric Abbès, French archaeologist
- Hachem Abbès (born 1986), Tunisian footballer
- Nour Abbès – Tunisian tennis player (born 1993)
- Walid Ben Abbes – Tunisian volleyball player (born 1980)
- Abbes Saidi – Tunisian Paralympic athlete

== Places ==
- Sidi Bel Abbès
- Béni Abbès – Town and commune in Béchar Province, Algeria
- Ouled Abbes – Town and commune in Chlef Province, Algeria
