= Hugh de Willoughby (1135–1205) =

Sir Hugh deWilloughby (1135–1205) was an English knight and nobleman in medieval England.

== Family ==
Hugh deWillougby was the son of John de Willoughby who held the Lordship of Willoughby, and his wife of an unknown name. He married Frethsand Cockerington, daughter of William de Cokerinton and Berta. He had two known sons. Despite Ralph de Willoughby being the older brother, he did not inherit his father's wealth, which indicates that he could have possibly been a bastard.

- Ralph deWilloughby (1166–1235)
- William de Willoughby (1175–1225)

== Biography ==
Sir Hugh de Willoughby was born in 1135 in Willoughby, Lincolnshire, England. When his wife's father, William de Cokerinton died, Sir Hugh de Willoughby inherited the villages of Cumberworth and Thorpe.
