= Diemoth =

German artist (c. 1060 – c. 1130)

Diemoth (Latinised as Diemudus, Diemut, Diemud, Diemuth, Diemod or Diemudis) was a recluse at Wessobrunn Abbey in Upper Bavaria, Germany, born around 1060 and died on 30 March, probably in 1130. She worked on 45 manuscripts from 1075 to 1130. Her name comes from the Middle High German word for "humility" or "modesty")

Little is known about Diemoth's private life. Most of the available information is based on a sixteenth-century biographer. Much of this must be considered embellished legend rather than fact. According to the traditional version, she was born of a noble Bavarian or Swabian family, and while still a child entered the Benedictine nunnery connected with the Benedictine monastery of Wessobrunn. This is almost certainly not true, since the Wessobrunn monastery was male-only until at least CE 1100. The monks would not have taken it upon themselves to educate one single young girl. Thus it is much more likely that Diemoth entered the Wessobrunn monastery as an adult. Her proficient handwriting shows evidence of professional training, so that it is likely Diemoth did not come to Wessobrunn until after an active career as a professional scribe. Her knowledge of Latin indicates that she was educated at an ecclesiastical institute, probably a double monastery elsewhere in Germany.

Diemoth had herself enclosed in a cell adjoining the church, where she spent the remainder of her life in prayer and in transcribing valuable books. On account of her exceptionally beautiful handwriting she was styled "the beautiful scribe". She copied about forty-five volumes, of which the most important are: the Bible; the Moralia and other works of Saint Gregory the Great; seven works of Saint Augustine; four of Saint Jerome; two of Origen; and about fifteen liturgical works.

Diemoth was a great friend of the Blessed Herluka with whom she exchanged numerous letters while the latter was a recluse at the neighbouring monastery of Epfach. The letters were long preserved at the monastery of Bernried where Herluka spent the last years of her life, but they unhappily fell prey to the ravages of the forces of Sweden during the Thirty Years War. A few of Diemoth's manuscripts are still preserved at the Bayerische Staatsbibliothek in Munich, where they were taken after the secularisation of Wessobrunn in 1803.

Diemoth was buried in the basilica of Our Lady at Wessobrunn, beside the bodies of Abbot Thiento and his six companions, who suffered martyrdom at the hands of the Hungarians in 955. In 1709 her remains were transferred to the abbey church of St. Peter. She is sometimes referred to as "Blessed," though she has never received public veneration and was never formally beatified.
