= Treaty of Durham (1136) =

1136 treaty between England and Scotland

The first treaty of Durham was a peace treaty concluded between kings Stephen of England and David I of Scotland on 5 February 1136.

In January 1136, during the first months of the reign of Stephen, David I crossed the border and reached Durham. He took Carlisle, Wark, Alnwick, Norham and Newcastle-upon-Tyne. On 5 February 1136, Stephen reached Durham with an imposing troop of Flemish mercenaries, and the Scottish king was obliged to negotiate. Stephen recovered Wark, Alnwick, Norham and Newcastle, and let David I retain Carlisle and a great part of Cumberland and Lancashire, alongside Doncaster.

The English king asked the Scottish king to make him oath of allegiance, but David had already sworn one with his niece Empress Matilda, heir to Henry I from whom Stephen had usurped the throne. David I asked his son Henry, to make the oath, in return for which he was made Earl of the Honour of Huntingdon and Northampton which up to that point had been held by his father.

In 1138, David invaded the North of England again, leading to the Battle of the Standard and the Treaty of Durham (1139).

== Primary Sources ==
Howlett, Richard (Edit.): The Cronicles of Richard, Prior of Hexham (= Chronicles of the Reign of Stephan, Henry II., and Richard I. vol. 3, p. 2) London 1964, p. 146
