= Abd al-Majid ibn Abdun =

Poet from Al-Andalus

- عبد المجيد بن عبدون اليابري
- Born: c. 1050; Al-Andalus
- Died: 1135; Évora
- Occupations: Poet, Secretary
- Writing career
- Language: Arabic
- Period: Taifa of Badajoz
- Genre: Poetry
- Subjects: Elegy, Politics
- Notable works: Diwan, Al-Qasidah al-bassamah (The Abduniyya)

Abd al-Majid ibn Abdun, or in full Abu Mohammed Abd al-Majid ibn Abdun al-Yaburi عبد المجيد بن عبدون اليابري (c. 1050-1135, died in Évora) was a poet from Al-Andalus. He was the secretary of one of the two kings of the Taifa of Badajoz (governing in Évora) Umar ibn Mohammed al-Muwakkil (1078) of the Berber Miknasa Aftasid dynasty. When the Aftasid dynasty was defeated and Badajoz conquered by the Almoravids, Ibn Abdun became the secretary of Yusuf ibn Tashfin and later of his son Ali ibn Yusuf. He wrote a diwan. One of his best known poems is a qasida (elegy) on the downfall of the house of the Aftasids, known as al-Qasidah al-bassamah or sometimes the Abduniyya. Ibn Badrun (died 1211), himself a well known poet of Al-Andalus, wrote a lengthy commentary on the poems and prose of Ibn Abdun (Cup of the Flower and Shell of the Pearl), translated and edited by Reinhart Dozy in 1848.

== See also ==
- Abd al-Malik ibn Abd Allah Ibn Badrun

== Footnotes and literature ==
- Sharh Qasidat al-wazir al-katib fīl-adab wa-al-maratib li-AbīAbd al-Majid ibn Abdun, by Abd al-Malik ibn Abd Allah Ibn Badrun; Mahmud Hasan Shaybani; Abd al-Majid ibn Abd Allah Ibn Abdun, ed.: al-Riyad : M.H. al-Shaybanī, 1993.
- Abd al-Malik ibn Abd Allah Ibn Badrun, Sharh qasidat Ibn Abdun al-marufah bi-al-basamah fīal-tarikh wa-al-adab, Cairo: Mahbaat al-Saadah, 1921/22
- María José Rebollo Avalos, La cultura en el reino Taifa de Badajoz : Ibn Abdun de Evora (m. 530/1135), Departamento de Publicaciones de la Excma. Diputación Provincial de Badajoz, 1997
- José Mohedano Barceló, Ibn Abdun de Evora, c. 1050-1135 : breve apresentacão e seleccão dos seus poemas, Evora : Universidade de Evora, 1982.
