= 1207 =

1207 in various calendars
- Gregorian calendar: 1207; MCCVII
- Ab urbe condita: 1960
- Armenian calendar: 656; ԹՎ ՈԾԶ
- Assyrian calendar: 5957
- Balinese saka calendar: 1128–1129
- Bengali calendar: 613–614
- Berber calendar: 2157
- English Regnal year: 8 Joh. 1 – 9 Joh. 1
- Buddhist calendar: 1751
- Burmese calendar: 569
- Byzantine calendar: 6715–6716
- Chinese calendar: 丙寅年 (Fire Tiger); 3904 or 3697 — to — 丁卯年 (Fire Rabbit); 3905 or 3698
- Coptic calendar: 923–924
- Discordian calendar: 2373
- Ethiopian calendar: 1199–1200
- Hebrew calendar: 4967–4968
- Hindu calendars
- Vikram Samvat: 1263–1264
- Shaka Samvat: 1128–1129
- Kali Yuga: 4307–4308
- Holocene calendar: 11207
- Igbo calendar: 207–208
- Iranian calendar: 585–586
- Islamic calendar: 603–604
- Japanese calendar: Ken'ei 2 / Jōgen 1 (承元元年)
- Javanese calendar: 1115–1116
- Julian calendar: 1207; MCCVII
- Korean calendar: 3540
- Minguo calendar: 705 before ROC 民前705年
- Nanakshahi calendar: −261
- Thai solar calendar: 1749–1750
- Tibetan calendar: མེ་ཕོ་སྟག་ལོ་ (male Fire-Tiger); 1333 or 952 or 180 — to — མེ་མོ་ཡོས་ལོ་ (female Fire-Hare); 1334 or 953 or 181

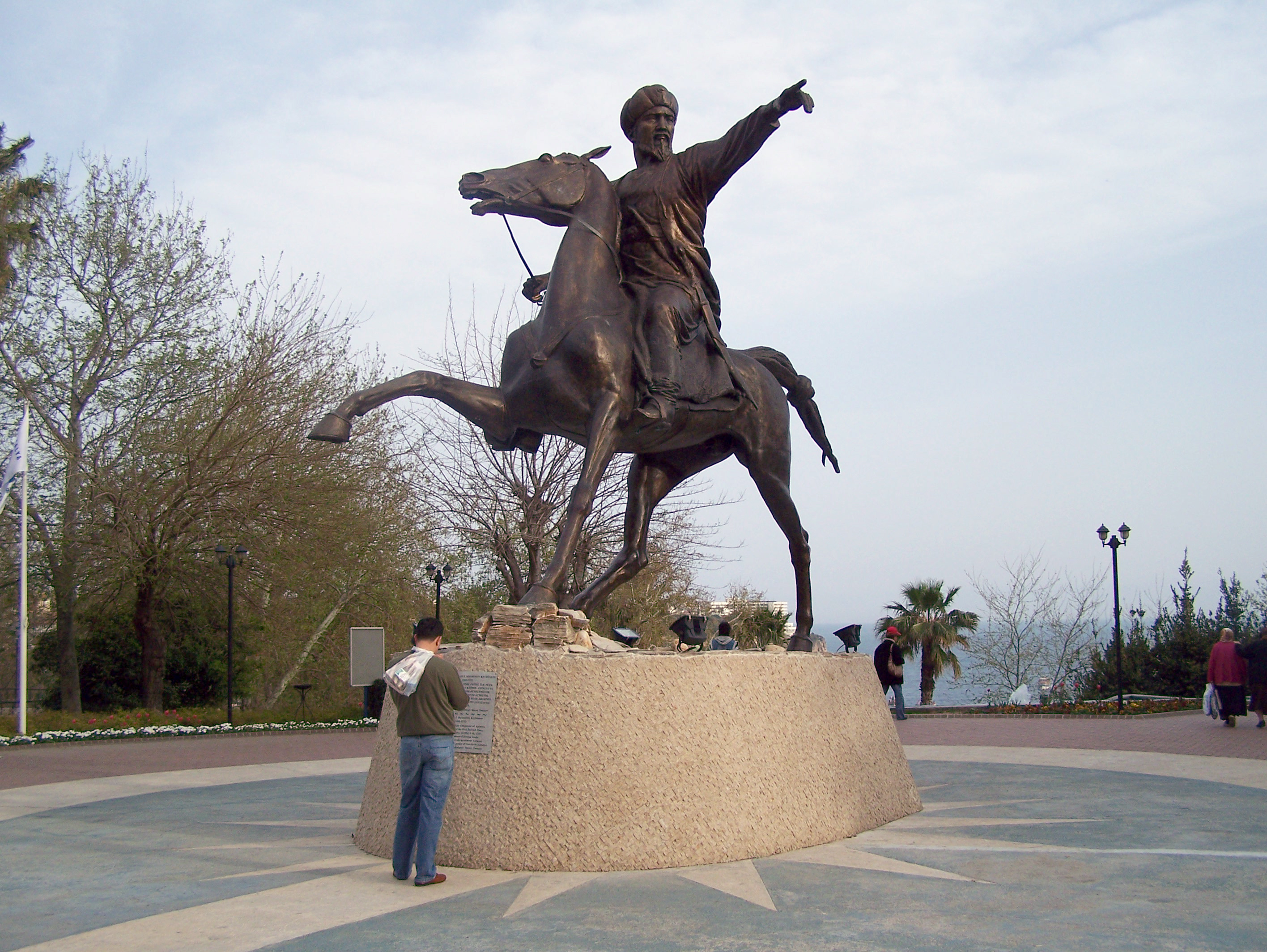
Statue of Kaykhusraw I (r. 1192–1211)

Year 1207 (MCCVII) was a common year starting on Monday (full calendar) under the Julian calendar.

== Events ==
=== By place ===
==== Byzantine Empire ====
- Spring – Siege of Attalia: Seljuk forces led by Sultan Kaykhusraw I besiege the city port of Attalia (modern-day Antalya) with siege machines. After a siege of more than 2 months, the city is captured, Kaykhusraw allows his forces 3 days of looting and slaughtering. The capture of the port gives the Seljuk Turks a major path into the Mediterranean.
- September 4 – Battle of Messinopolis: Latin forces under Boniface of Montferrat are ambushed and defeated at Messinopolis. Boniface is killed and his head is sent to Kaloyan, ruler (tsar) of the Bulgarian Empire. Seeking to take advantage of the situation, Kaloyan besieges Thessalonica. In October, he dies under mysterious circumstances.

==== Europe ====
- February 2 – Terra Mariana (or Medieval Livonia), comprising modern-day Estonia and Latvia, is established as a principality of the Holy Roman Empire. During its existence there is a constant struggle over supremacy between the lands ruled by the Teutonic Order, the secular German nobility, and the citizens of the Hanseatic towns of Riga and Reval.
- Prince Mstislav Mstislavich ("the Daring") clashes with his uncle Rurik Rostislavich, Grand Prince of Kiev, and is forced to surrender the town of Torchesk (a major centre of resistance against Polovtsian raids).
- Pope Innocent III declares for King Philip of Swabia as Holy Roman Emperor, a reversal of his previous support for Philip's rival Otto IV.

==== England ====
- John, King of England ("Lackland") introduces the first income tax. One-thirteenth of income from rents and moveable property has to be paid. Collected locally by sheriffs and administered by the Exchequer, the tax is unpopular with the English nobility and especially in the churches and monasteries, but does raise a lot of money for John, doubling his annual income for the year.
- May 24 – John still refuses to accept Stephen Langton as archbishop; Innocent III threatens to place England under an Interdict. In response, John confiscates church property. Many of the English bishops of the great churches in the country flee abroad to the Continent.
- November – Leeds, a market town in West Yorkshire, receives its first charter (approximate date).

==== Asia ====
- Jochi, eldest son of Genghis Khan, subjugates people of the Siberian forest (taiga); the Uriankhai, the Oirats, the Barga, the Khakas, the Buryats, and the Tuvans, extending the northern border of the Mongol Empire.
- Hōnen and his followers of the Pure Land sect are persecuted and exiled to remote parts of Japan, while a few are executed, for what the government considers heretical Buddhist teachings.
- In Vietnam, the Lý dynasty witnessed the political crisis under king Lý Cao Tông. The barbarians in Tản Viên mountain rebelled against the emperor. They continued to rule Tản Viên mountain independently until the beginning of the Trần dynasty. In March, two chieftains Đoàn Thượng, Đoàn Chủ in Hồng Châu (present day Hải Dương and Hải Phòng) rebelled and declared themselves kings. Their rebellions lasted for 2 years, contributing to the fall of the Ly dynasty.
- Before 1207 – Kosho writes Kuya Preaching, during the Kamakura period (it is later kept at Rokuharamitsu-ji Temple in Kyoto).
- October 7 – The Indramayu Regency in Nusantara is established.

=== By topic ===
==== Economy ====
- The first documentary evidence of forced loans in Venice. This technique becomes the staple of public finance in Europe, until the 16th century.

==== Religion ====
- June 17 – Stephen Langton is consecrated as archbishop of Canterbury in England by Innocent III at Viterbo.

== Births ==
- July 7 – Elizabeth of Hungary, Hungarian princess (d. 1231)
- August 13 – Malik ibn al-Murahhal, Moroccan poet (d. 1299)
- September 30 – Rumi, Persian scholar and mystic (d. 1273)
- October 1 – Henry III (of Winchester), English king (d. 1272)
- Adelasia of Torres, Italian noblewoman and judge (d. 1259)
- Canute (or Knud Valdemarsen), duke of Estonia (d. 1260)
- Elen ferch Llywelyn (the Elder), Welsh princess, countess in England (d. 1253)
- Fujiwara no Akiuji, Japanese nobleman and poet (d. 1274)
- Fujiwara no Ariko, Japanese empress consort (d. 1286)
- Gilbert Marshal, English nobleman and knight (d. 1241)
- Henry II, Duke of Brabant, Dutch nobleman (House of Reginar) (d. 1248)
- Jakuen, Japanese Buddhist monk and scholar (d. 1299)
- John of Scotland, Scottish nobleman and knight (d. 1237)
- Margaret of Louvain, Flemish servant and saint (d. 1237)
- Ottone Visconti, Italian nobleman and archbishop (d. 1295)
- Philip I, Count of Savoy, French nobleman (d. 1285)
- Raymond II Trencavel (or Raimond), French nobleman (d. 1263)
- Sadr al-Din al-Qunawi, Persian philosopher (d. 1274)
- Vladislaus II, Bohemian nobleman and knight (d. 1227)

== Deaths ==
- February 7 – Sambor I, duke of Pomerania (b. 1150)
- March 1 – Fernando Afonso, Portuguese Grand Master
- May 3 – Fujiwara no Kanezane, Japanese nobleman
- May 7 – Abdul Razzaq Gilani, Persian jurist (b. 1134)
- June 6 – Gerardo dei Tintori, Italian mystic (b. 1134)
- June 13 – Xie, Chinese empress consort (b. 1135)
- June 19 – Ubaldo Lanfranchi, Italian archbishop
- August 21 – Simon of Wells, bishop of Chichester
- September 4
  - Boniface I of Montferrat, Italian nobleman
  - Raimbaut de Vaqueiras, French troubadour
- October – Kaloyan, ruler (tsar) of the Bulgarian Empire
- October 3 – Xin Qiji, Chinese general and poet (b. 1140)
- November 3 – Hartwig II, German archbishop
- November 24 – Han Tuozhou, Chinese statesman (b. 1152)
- unknown date – Amalric of Bena, French theologian and mystic
- probable
  - Bona of Pisa, Italian nun and mystic (b. 1156)
  - David Soslan, Alanian prince and king consort
