= Dirmicius of Regensburg =

Irish abbot

Dirmicius of Regensburg, 2nd Abbot of Regensburg, fl. 1121–1133.

The Schottenkloster of Saint James was founded at Regensburg for Irish Benedictine monks in 1110. According to Harbison (1975) – who quotes a 13th-century source – the second abbot was called Dirmicius. His original name was probably Dermot. Dirmicius ruled from about 1121 to 1133.

According to Elsasser, during this time, he sent two men, Conrad the Carpenter and William the Joiner, to help with the construction of Cormac's Chapel on the Rock of Cashel. Harbison states that Dirmicius sent two of his monks to Ireland during the reign of King Conchobar Ó Briain of Thomond (reigned 1127–1142) to collect money "presumably for the building of a church in Regensburg." (Harbison, 1975)

The only surviving part of the Schottenkloster is the north portal – the Jakobskirche – which consists of "two square towers and a part of the eastern apse. These two towers have been invoked as models upon which the two towers of Cormac's Chapel in Cashel were based." (Harbison, 1975)

At least one charter survives mentioning Dirmicius (see external links).
