= 1140s =

Decade

The 1140s was a decade of the Julian Calendar which began on January 1, 1140, and ended on December 31, 1149.

== Events ==
=== By place ===
==== Levant ====
- Spring – King Fulk of Jerusalem confronts Imad al-Din Zengi, Seljuk ruler (atabeg) of Mosul, near Dara'a in southern Syria. Turkish forces under Mu'in al-Din (supported by the Crusaders) besiege Banias.

==== Europe ====
- Spring – King Conrad III enfeoffs Henry II ("Jasomirgott"), a member of the House of Babenberg, with the County Palatine of the Rhine (belonging to the Holy Roman Empire).
- Summer – King Roger II promulgates the Assizes of Ariano (a series of laws to rule the Norman Kingdom of Sicily) after the pacification of southern Italy.
- December 21 – Siege of Weinsberg: Conrad III captures the castle at Weinsberg during the civil war between the Staufers and the Welfs in Germany.

==== England and Scotland ====
- Summer – King Stephen appoints Geoffrey de Mandeville as Earl of Essex for his support during the civil war against Matilda (Stephen's cousin).
- The town of Lanark in Scotland is made a Royal Burgh by King David I, giving it merchant privileges relating to government and taxation.

==== Asia ====
- August 21 – Jin–Song Wars – Battle of Yancheng: Chinese forces under the command of Yue Fei defeat a numerically superior Jin army led by Wuzhu.

=== By topic ===
==== Religion ====
- June 3 – Pierre Abelard, a French theologian, is condemned for heresy by the Council of Sens. He sets out for Rome to present his defense to Pope Innocent II.
- September 8 – Sephardi Jewish philosopher Judah Halevi, having completed the Kuzari, arrives in Alexandria on a pilgrimage to Palestine.
- The first Cistercian monastery in Spain is founded in Fitero. The order enjoys a rapid expansion in the region in the following 15 years.

==== Literature ====
- Gratian, an Italian monk and canon lawyer, founds the science of Canon law with the publication of the Decretum Gratiani (approximate date).

=== 1141 ===
- February 2 – The Anarchy in the Kingdom of England – Battle of Lincoln: Robert, 1st Earl of Gloucester and Empress Matilda wrest control of the throne of England from King Stephen, who is captured and imprisoned.
- February 13 – Géza II is crowned King of Hungary and Croatia at age 11, succeeding his father.
- May 14 – Sephardi Jewish philosopher Judah Halevi sets off from Alexandria on a pilgrimage to Palestine.
- September 9 – Battle of Qatwan: Yelü Dashi, founder of the Qara Khitai, defeats the Seljuk Empire and Kara-Khanid forces.
- September 14 – The Anarchy in the Kingdom of England – Rout of Winchester: Empress Matilda returns to the throne, after Robert is captured by loyalist forces.
- November 1 – The Anarchy in the Kingdom of England – Robert, 1st Earl of Gloucester is exchanged by Empress Matilda for King Stephen, who reassumes the throne of England.
- November – The Jin dynasty and Southern Song dynasty sign the Treaty of Shaoxing, and peace in the Jin–Song Wars lasts for the next twenty years. The Huai River is established as the boundary between them.
- The first German colonists (the future Transylvanian Saxon community) arrive in Transylvania, following grants by Geza II of Hungary. The colonization process is completed in 1162.
- The Italian winemaking company Ricasoli is founded.

=== By topic ===
==== Religion ====
- April 1 – Alberic of Ostia, papal legate to Outremer, solemnly dedicates the Templum Domini in Jerusalem.
- April 2 – In a legatine council convened by Alberic of Ostia in the Templum Domini, the claim of the Latin Patriarch of Antioch over the diocese of Tyre is rejected. Also, a step towards church unity between the Armenian and Latin Church is achieved when the Armenian Catholicos Gregory III makes a profession of faith and promises to restore union with Rome, which is achieved at the end of the century.

=== By place ===
==== Byzantine Empire ====
- Spring – Emperor John II Komnenos and his sons lead a Byzantine expeditionary force across Anatolia to Antalya. He drives back the Seljuks and Turcomans – who again are trying to invade Phrygia. John strengthens the frontier defences in northern Syria and sends an embassy to Germany – to seek an alliance against King Roger II of Sicily. To seal the alliance, the emissaries request that King Conrad III send a princess of his family to be married to the emperor's son, Manuel. Instead, Conrad selects his sister-in-law, Bertha of Sulzbach, and sends her to the Byzantine Empire escorted by Emicho, bishop of Würzburg.
- Late Summer – John II establishes a supply base for his further campaigns at Antalya. While waiting for reinforcements, his eldest son Alexios and appointed heir, falls ill and dies. His other two sons, Andronikos and Isaac are tasked to escort the body, but during the voyage Andronikos also dies. John continues his campaign against the Armenian kingdom of Cilicia – to re-conquer the fortresses that the Danishmends have taken. He appears by forced marches at Turbessel in mid-September. Meanwhile, Isaac brings the corpses of his two brothers back to Constantinople, where they are entombed in the Pantokrator Monastery.

==== Europe ====
- King Louis VII the Younger of France becomes involved in a civil war with Theobald II ("the Great"), count of Champagne, by permitting his cousin Ralph I of Vermandois (seneschal of France) to repudiate his wife, Theobald's sister Eleanor of Champagne, and to marry Petronilla of Aquitaine, who was the sister of King Louis VII’s wife, Queen Eleanor of Aquitaine.
- Sigurd II, a Norwegian pretender, is joined in his efforts to overthrow the 7-year-old King Inge Haraldsson of Norway by Inge's older half-brother Eystein II, who becomes co-ruler. He receives one third of the late Harald's kingdom.
- May – Conrad III makes a peace agreement with the 13-year-old Henry the Lion at Frankfurt. He is appointed as duke of Saxony, which territories are deprived from his father, the late Duke Henry the Proud.
- Duke Władysław II the Exile attempts to subject his younger (half)-brothers to re-unite Poland. He is supported by the alliances with the Kievan Rus' and the Holy Roman Empire.
- Summer – Conrad III enters Bohemia to reinstate his brother-in-law Vladislaus II as duke, whose half-sister Gertrude of Babenberg he is married. Conrad lays siege to the Prague Castle.
- Siege of Lisbon (1142): King Afonso I of Portugal attempts to besiege Lisbon with the aid of a group of Anglo-Norman crusaders.

==== England ====
- Autumn – The 9-year-old Henry of Anjou, a son of Empress Matilda, lands on the south coast of England with his uncle, Earl Robert of Gloucester and several knights. Henry travels to Bristol, centre of Angevin opposition to King Stephen, where he is educated by Master Matthew. Meanwhile, Robert captures Lulworth Castle, Rufus Castle ("Bow and Arrow Castle") on the Isle of Portland and Wareham Castle.
- December – Stephen lays siege to Oxford Castle, trapping Matilda and her supporters inside the city. Just before Christmas she manages to escape across the snow and ice of the frozen Thames River – dressed in white (to get past Stephen's pickets), and safely reaches Abingdon. The next day Oxford Castle surrenders to Stephen, Matilda rides with an escort to Wallingford Castle, where she seeks refuge.

==== Levant ====
- Autumn – Imad al-Din Zengi, Seljuk governor (atabeg) of Mosul, continues his campaign against the Kurds in southeastern Anatolia (since 1141). Byzantine forces under John II fail to take Antioch.
- Raymond II, count of Tripoli, grants property in the county (such as the massive castle Krak des Chevaliers) to the Knights Hospitaller. After acquiring the site, they begin building new fortifications.

==== Africa ====
- Abd al-Mu'min, ruler of the Almohad Caliphate, is unable to feed his population during a famine. He recognize the de facto protectorate of Roger II to support the commercial center of Mahdia.
- A Norman raid against the city of Tripoli fails.

==== Asia ====
- January 5 – Emperor Sutoku abdicates the throne after a 19-year reign and becomes a monk. He is succeeded by his 3-year-old brother Konoe, who accedes as the 76th emperor of Japan.
- January 28 – Despite having saved the southern Song Dynasty from attempts by the northern Jin Dynasty to conquer it, Chinese general Yue Fei is executed by the Song government.
- October 11 – Treaty of Shaoxing: The northern Jin Dynasty and Southern Song Dynasty sign a peace treaty, this ending the Jurchen campaigns against the Song Dynasty in China.

==== America ====
- August 31 - Suggested date of the founding of the Iroquois Confederacy.

=== By place ===
==== Byzantine Empire ====
- April 8 – Emperor John II Komnenos Komnenos dies of a poisoned arrow wound while hunting wild boar on Mount Taurus in Cilicia. He is succeeded by his 24-year-old son Manuel I, who is chosen as his successor, in preference to his elder surviving brother Isaac. Manuel dispatches John Axouchos, his commander-in-chief (megas domestikos), to Constantinople ahead of him – with orders to arrest Isaac in the Great Palace.

==== Levant ====
- November 13 – King Fulk of Jerusalem dies after a hunting accident in Acre. He is succeeded by his 13-year-old son Baldwin III – who is crowned as co-ruler alongside his mother, Queen Melisende on Christmas Day. Due to the political situation the Crusader States of Tripoli, Antioch and Edessa assert their independence. Raymond of Antioch demands the return of Cilicia to his principality and invades the province.

==== Europe ====
- Spring – King Conrad III gives Bavaria to his half-brother Henry II ("Jasomirgott"). His wife, Gertrude (daughter of the late Emperor Lothair III) dies in childbirth at Klosterneuburg Monastery in Lower Austria on April 18.
- October 5 – Treaty of Zamora: The Kingdom of Portugal is recognized by King Alfonso VII ("the Emperor") of León and Castile in the presence of his cousin, King Afonso I of Portugal and papal representatives.
- Adolf II, count of Schauenburg and Holstein, founds Lübeck – which later becomes one of the leading Hanseatic cities. He divides the conquered Slavic lands, as part of the eastward expansion in Germany.
- Geoffrey V ("the Fair") becomes Count of Anjou upon news of the death of his father Fulk.

==== England ====
- July 1 – Battle of Wilton: Earl Robert of Gloucester (illegitimate son of the late King Henry I) defeats the English forces of King Stephen during a surprise attack at Wilton Abbey. In the darkness, Stephen escapes, while his steward William Martel fights a rearguard action to delay the pursuers.
- Autumn – Stephen arrests Geoffrey de Mandeville, 1st Earl of Essex, during a meeting of the Royal Court at St. Albans. He is charged with treason against Stephen, but given his freedom back in return for surrendering his title and castles. Geoffrey becomes an outlaw and fortifies Ramsey Abbey, where he sets up his headquarters to plunder the countryside of Ely.

==== Africa ====
- Norman raiders capture Jijel (modern Algeria). A Norman raid on Ceuta fails, but at the same time the Normans lead a successful assault against Sfax.

=== By topic ===
==== Religion ====
- September 23 – Pope Innocent II dies at Rome after a 13-year pontificate. He is succeeded by Celestine II as the 165th pope of the Catholic Church.

==== Literature ====
- Robert of Ketton makes the first European translation of the Qur'an for Peter the Venerable, Lex Mahumet pseudoprophete, into Latin.

=== By place ===
==== Levant ====
- Autumn – Imad al-Din Zengi, Seljuk governor (atabeg) of Mosul, attacks the Artuqid forces led by Kara Arslan – who has made an alliance with Joscelin II, count of Edessa. In support of the alliance Joscelin marches out of Edessa with a Crusader army down to the Euphrates River, to cut off Zengi's communications with Aleppo. Zengi is informed by Muslim observers at Harran of Joscelin's movements. He sends a detachment of Muslims to ambush the Crusaders and reaches Edessa with his main army in late November.
- December 24 – Siege of Edessa: Seljuk forces led by Imad al-Din Zengi conquer the fortress city of Edessa after a four-week siege. Thousands of inhabitants are massacred – only the Muslims are spared. The women and children are sold into slavery. This eliminates the Crusader principality of Outremer. Lacking the forces to take on Zengi, Joscelin II retires to his fortress at Turbessel. There, he requests reinforcements from the Byzantines and Queen-Regent Melisende of Jerusalem. This will lead to the Pope preaching a Second Crusade.
- 14-year old Baldwin III of Jerusalem quells a rebellion in Wadi Musa.

==== Europe ====
- Spring – Italo-Norman forces under King Roger II of Sicily invade the Papal States to force Pope Lucius II to accept his truce, but the patrician Giordano Pierleoni, brother of the late Antipope Anacletus II, leads the Roman populace to proclaim a constitutional republic free of papal authority with regard to civil rule. Pierleoni takes over the papal capital, and establishes the Commune of Rome in the style of the old Roman Republic.
- Summer – Geoffrey Plantagenet, Count of Anjou ("the Fair", husband of Empress Matilda) completes his conquest of Normandy, which comes under Angevin control. In exchange for being recognised as Duke of Normandy by King Louis VII of France, Geoffrey surrenders half of the county of Vexin – a region vital to Norman security – to Louis.
- The city of Montauban in southern France is founded by Count Alfonso Jordan of Toulouse.
- The city of Ljubljana (modern Slovenia) is first mentioned in historical records.

==== England ====
- Autumn – Geoffrey de Mandeville, 1st Earl of Essex, is mortally wounded by a stray arrow received in a skirmish. Because he is an outlaw, his burial is denied at the monastery he has founded, Walden Abbey. Geoffrey's body is eventually accepted by the Knights Templar community for burial within the Temple Church in London.

==== Africa ====
- Catalan mercenary Reverter de La Guardia, the main Almoravid commander in the Maghrid al-Aqsa, dies. His elimination opens the regions to the troops of the Almohads.

=== By topic ===
==== Religion ====
- March 8 – Pope Celestine II dies at Rome after a 5-month pontificate. He is succeeded by Lucius II as the 166th pope of the Catholic Church.
- March 22 – The first example of an anti-Semitic blood libel is recorded in England, in connection with the murder of William of Norwich.
- June 11 – The Basilica of St. Denis near Paris is completed, and consecrated in the presence of Louis VII – as the first Gothic church.
- The Lesmahagow Priory in Scotland, is founded after John, bishop of Glasgow, and King David I have granted lands at Lesmahagow.
- The first Knights Templar stronghold is established in the Kingdom of León and Castile.

=== By place ===
==== Levant ====
- Spring – Seljuk forces led by Imad al-Din Zengi capture Saruj, the second great Crusader fortress east of the Euphrates. They advance to Birejik and besiege the city, but the garrison puts up a stiff resistance. Meanwhile, Queen-Regent Melisende of Jerusalem joins forces with Joscelin II, count of Edessa and approaches the city. Zengi raises the siege after hearing rumours of trouble in Mosul. He rushes back with his army to take control. There, Zengi is praised throughout Islam as "defender of the faith" and al-Malik al-Mansur, the "victorious king".
- Raymond of Poitiers, prince of Antioch, travels to Constantinople to ask Emperor Manuel I Komnenos for help to support his campaign against the Seljuks. When he arrives, Raymond is forced to accept the suzerainty of the Byzantine Empire. Manuel treats him graciously, gives him gifts and promises him a money subsidy.

==== Europe ====
- Spring – Arnold of Brescia, an Italian priest from Lombardy, turns Rome into a republic with a government patterned on that of the Roman Republic. Arnold becomes the intellectual leader of the Commune of Rome, calling for liberties and democratic rights after the deposition of Giordano Pierleoni.

==== Africa ====
- Spring – Almohad forces under Abd al-Mu'min defeat a Muslim Almoravid army at Tlemcen. Almoravid ruler Tashfin ibn Ali dies while escaping his enemies near Oran. He is succeeded by his son Ibrahim ibn Tashfin.
- The Merinids of Maghrib al-Aqsa attempt to resist the Almohads but are forced into the desert areas around the Tafilalt. Oran falls to the Almohads. A Norman raid against the Tripolitania region succeeds.

==== Asia ====
- Estimation: Merv (in the Seljuk Empire) becomes the largest city in the world, surpassing Constantinople.

=== By topic ===
==== Art and Culture ====
- Kim Pusik and his team of historians finish the compilation of the Korean historical text Samguk Sagi.
- Construction begins on Notre-Dame de Chartres Cathedral in Chartres, France.

==== Religion ====
- February 15 – Pope Lucius II dies at Rome after having been hit by a stone missile during the fighting against Senatorial forces led by Giordano Pierleoni. He is succeeded after an 11-month pontificate by Eugene III who becomes the 167th pope of the Catholic Church. Eugene is forced into exile by Arnold of Brescia.
- Woburn Abbey is founded by the Cistercians in England. A colony of monks arrive from Fountains Abbey to establish a community that will survive until 1234.
- December 1 – Eugene III issues the bull Quantum praedecessores, calling for the Second Crusade. At Christmas, King Louis VII announces his intention of making a pilgrimage which becomes part of the Crusade.

=== By place ===
==== Europe ====
- March 31 – Bernard of Clairvaux, commissioned by Pope Eugene III, preaches the Second Crusade at Vézelay, in Burgundy. King Louis VII of France and his wife, Queen Eleanor of Aquitaine, take up the cross. In a repeat of the events of 1096, Crusaders attack and massacre Jewish communities along the Rhine. Encouraged by his success, Bernard undertakes a tour in Burgundy, Lorraine and Flanders – preaching the Crusade as he goes.
- Eric III of Denmark abdicates as king, retiring to St. Canute's Abbey, Odense, where he dies on August 27, in his mid-20s. Canute V is elected to succeed him in Jutland and Sweyn III in Zealand.
- Władysław II ("the Exiled"), High Duke of Poland, suffers a defeat against the coalition forces under his brother Bolesław IV ("the Curly"). Władysław and his family escape across the border to Bohemia and later seek refuge in Germany. Bolesław captures Silesia and the Senioral territories, and becomes the new ruler of Greater Poland.
- The Republic of Genoa raids the Muslim-held Balearic Islands. The Republic of Pisa protests officially – seeing the islands as rightfully theirs. The Genoese then proceed to lay siege to Almería, in vain.
- The Republic of Genoa reaches a commercial agreement with Ramon Berenguer IV, count of Barcelona, granting privileges to merchants of both nations in the Catalan and Ligurian ports.
- December 25 – Diet of Speyer: King Conrad III takes the cross and secures the election of his 10-year-old son Henry as his successor in Germany.
- The city of Bryansk (modern Russia) is first mentioned in the Hypatian Codex.

==== Levant ====
- Autumn – Siege of Edessa: The Crusaders under Joscelin II recapture Edessa (Northern Syria) from Nur ad-Din, Seljuk ruler of Damascus. After not receiving support from the other Crusader states, Nur ad-Din counter-raids the territory of Antioch but withdraws his forces to retake Edessa in November.

==== Seljuk Empire ====
- Eldiguz, Seljuk ruler (atabeg) of Azerbaijan, founds the Eldiguzid Dynasty and establishes an independent state within the Seljuk Empire.

==== Africa ====
- Summer – King Roger II launches a full scale invasion into North Africa, seizing lands from Emir Abu'l-Hasan al-Hasan ibn Ali in what is now parts of Algeria, Tunisia and Libya – thereby opening up more of the mercantile wealth of the Muslim world to Sicilian merchants. On June 18, George of Antioch conquers Tripoli and establishes more Sicilian authority.
- The Almohad caliph Abd al-Mu'min conquers most of Morocco from the Almoravids.

=== By topic ===
==== Climate ====
- A rainy year causes the harvest to fail in Europe; one of the worst famines of the century ensues.

==== Religion ====
- March 1 – Eugene III reissues the bull Quantum praedecessores, originally issued in December 1145), proclaiming the Second Crusade.

=== By place ===
==== Second Crusade ====
- Late spring – An expedition of Crusaders and Englishmen, together with forces from Flanders, Frisia, Scotland and some German polities, leaves from Dartmouth in England for the Holy Land. Leadership is provided by Hervey de Glanvill, a Norman nobleman and constable of Suffolk, who leads a fleet of some 200 ships. Bad weather forces them to take refuge at the mouth of the Douro River, on the Portuguese coast, on June 16.
- May – July – A German expeditionary force (some 20,000 men) under King Conrad III leaves Regensburg and passes into Hungary. The German nobility is headed by Conrad's nephew and heir, Frederick I, duke of Swabia. On July 20, Conrad crosses into the Byzantine Empire, and reaches Sofia – where Michael Palaiologos (a nephew of Emperor Manuel I) gives Conrad an official welcome and provides the Crusaders with food.
- June – A French expeditionary force (some 18,000 men) led by King Louis VII departs from Metz and travels through Bavaria. Louis is accompanied by the French nobility and his wife, Queen Eleanor of Aquitaine, heiress of France. At Regensburg, where the force arrives on June 29, the Crusaders journey peaceably for fifteen days through Hungary and reach the Byzantine frontier at the end of August.
- July 1–October 25 – Siege of Lisbon: King Afonso I of Portugal conquers Lisbon from the Taifa of Badajoz after a four-month siege, with support of English, Flemish and German Crusaders. The garrison surrenders on the guarantee that their lives will be spared. The Crusaders break the terms and take part in a bloody massacre. Afonso rules from his capital at Coimbra, takes Sintra and Santarém, and sacks Palmela.
- September 7 – The German crusaders suffer a natural disaster near Constantinople, when part of their encampment is swept away by a flash flood with considerable loss of life. Emperor Manuel I Komnenos orders the Crusaders to cross to Asia Minor by the Hellespont. Conrad III ignores the advice of Manuel and after some minor clashes with the Byzantines, pushes towards Constantinople.
- September 10 – The German crusaders under Conrad III reach Constantinople, where there is a frosty exchange of letters between Conrad and Manuel I. The German forces make camp at Galata on the northern shore of the Golden Horn. Manuel orders that a full-scale effort must be made to transport the Germans, who are causing troubles by sacking the Philopatium, across the Bosporus.
- Autumn – Conrad III decides not to wait for the French and crosses the Bosporus into Asia Minor. He leads the German crusader army to Nicomedia, and divides his forces into two divisions. Conrad takes the knights and his professional soldiers across Seljuk central territory while the baggage train, pilgrims and a defending force under Bishop Otto of Freising travel along the Aegean coast.
- October 4–5 – Louis VII arrives at Constantinople and joins with forces from Savoy under Amadeus III (his uncle) – who have taken the land route through Italy. Louis crosses the Bosporus, and leads the French crusader army into Asia Minor – where he hears in Nicaea of Conrad's defeat at the end of October. Louis sends a military escort for Conrad and agrees to rendezvous at Lopardium. The German crusaders under Otto of Freising follow the coastal road before turning inland, up the Gediz River valley to Philadelphia. Otto's force is ambushed by the Seljuk Turks, just outside Laodicea, losing many men killed or taken prisoner. Otto and the survivors struggle on to Adalia, from where they sail for the Holy Land. Others attempt to continue along the southern coast of Anatolia.
- October 25 – Battle of Dorylaeum: The German crusaders under Conrad III are defeated by the Seljuk Turks led by Sultan Mesud I. Conrad is forced to turn back and is wounded by arrows during the retreat to Nicaea. In Seljuk territory the Crusaders are harassed all the way and demoralised by the intensified attacks. Many of the weakest people fall behind and are captured by the Muslims.
- November – The combined forces of Louis VII and Conrad III meet at Lopardium and march along the coastal road via Pergamon and Smyrna to Ephesus, where they celebrate Christmas. Conrad, still suffering from his wounds, sails back to Constantinople to be placed under the care of Manuel's own physicians. Meanwhile, the Crusader camp is attacked by Turkish raiders near Ephesus.
- December 24 – Battle of Ephesus: The French crusaders under Louis VII leave Ephesus, and ascend the Meander Valley. Louis is warned by messengers of Manuel that Seljuk and Danishmendid forces are assembling west of Adalia. Louis ignores the advice and successfully fends off an ambush just outside Ephesus.

==== Europe ====
- April 13 – Pope Eugene III issues a bull (known as the Divina dispensatione), permitting Conrad III to attack the Polabian Slavs (or Wends) under the spiritual guidance of Bishop Anselm of Havelberg. The Crusaders are allowed to wear sacred crosses, and Bernard of Clairvaux instructs the Germans how to treat the Slavs under their control. "With God's help", says the abbot, "they shall be either converted or slaughtered".
- June – The Wendish Crusade: An expedition of Crusaders – composed of Germans, Saxons and Danes – expels the Obotrites from Wagria (Schleswig-Holstein). Two Danish fleets led by King Canute V in alliance with co-ruler Sweyn III, ravage the northern coast. The countryside of Mecklenburg and Pommerania is plundered and depopulated with much bloodshed, especially by German forces under Henry the Lion.
- July 17 – King Alfonso VII of León and Castile, leads a campaign at the head of mixed armies of Catalonia, Genoa, Pisa and France. He besieges Almería in southern Al-Andalus (modern Spain); a Genoese fleet of 63 galleys and 163 other vessels, blockade the Almoravid-held port, which is captured after a 2-month siege on October 17.
- A Sicilian fleet (some 70 ships) under George of Antioch attacks Corfu, the island surrenders and welcomes the Normans as their liberators. Leaving a garrison of 1,000 men, George sails to the Peloponnesus. He pillages the cities of Corinth, Athens and Thebes. King Roger II begins an 11-year war between Sicily and the Byzantine Empire.
- The first known reference to Moscow as a meeting place of Rurikid princes Yuri Dolgoruky and Sviatoslav Olgovich.

==== Levant ====
- May–June – Nur al-Din, Seljuk ruler (atabeg) of Aleppo, signs a peace treaty with Mu'in al-Din Unur. As part of the agreement, he marries Mu'in al-Din's daughter Ismat al-Din Khatun. Together Mu'in al-Din and Nur al-Din besiege the fortresses of Bosra and Salkhad, which has been captured by rebellious Muslim forces.
- Battle of Bosra: A Crusader force under King Baldwin III fights an inconclusive battle against Seljuk forces from Damascus led by Mu'in al-Din aided by Nur al-Din's contingents from Aleppo and Mosul. Baldwin retreats to Jerusalem, while the Seljuk Turks attack his rearguard and stragglers underway back to Palestine.

==== Africa ====
- Spring – The Almohads under Abd al-Mu'min destroy the Almoravid Empire. They capture Marrakesh and kill the last emir, Ishaq ibn Ali. Abd al-Mu'min orders the elimination of 30,000 Almoravids in a purge.
- The Siculo-Normans take control of Gabes (modern Tunisia).

=== By topic ===
==== Religion ====
- Spring – Eugene III leaves Viterbo and travels to France. At the start of April he meets Louis VII at Dijon. It is agreed that Abbot Suger, Louis' adviser, governs France while Louis is away.
- Congregation of Savigny is affiliated to the Cistercians.

=== By place ===
==== Second Crusade ====
- January 1 – The French crusaders under King Louis VII defeat a Turkish ambush next to the Meander River. Three days later they arrive at Laodicea – passing the spot where the German contingent led by Otto of Freising had been so disastrously ambushed (see 1147). The Crusaders are badly mauled as they cross Mount Cadmus (around January 8) before reaching Adalia on January 20.
- January 8 – Battle of Mount Cadmus: The French crusaders under Louis VII are defeated by the Seljuk Turks. The vanguard led by Geoffrey de Rancon ignores orders to pause and moves too far ahead, losing touch with the main army. The French are attacked by the Turks with the baggage train (almost 10 km long) unprotected. Louis is able to escape the fray under cover of the darkness.
- March – The French crusaders are left in Adalia; lack of available shipping obliges Louis VII to divide his forces – the knights and best troops accompany him to St. Symeon. Large numbers of pilgrims and non-combatants try to continue along the coastal road. Continually harassed by the Turks many French and Germans are killed. Less than half of them arrive in the late spring at Antioch.
- March 7 – King Conrad III recovers from his wounds and leaves Constantinople with his household. He is well supplied with money by Emperor Manuel I Komnenos and uses these funds to recruit pilgrims to augment the forces that remain to him. Conrad and his re-equipped Crusaders sail with a Byzantine fleet to Palestine. The fleet is scattered by storms and lands in different ports.
- March 19 – Louis VII and his wife, Queen Eleanor of Aquitaine, are welcomed at St. Symeon by Eleanor's uncle Raymond of Poitiers and all his household. Raymond escorts the French crusaders to Antioch, where for the next days festivities are held. He urges Louis to accompany him on an expedition against Aleppo but Louis refuses and prefers instead to finish his pilgrimage to Jerusalem.
- April – Southern French crusaders under Alfonso Jordan of Toulouse arrive by sea at Acre. Alfonso dies suddenly at Caesarea, resulting in the accusation that he has been poisoned by Count Raymond II of Tripoli. Most of the Provençal forces turn back and return home. Meanwhile, an unknown proportion of northern European naval crusaders (from England and Germany) arrive at Acre.
- April–May – Louis VII and the French crusaders remain in Antioch, but there are rumours of an incestuous affair between Eleanor of Aquitaine and Raymond of Poitiers. Louis, alarmed for his honour, departs with his army to Jerusalem in late May. Meanwhile, Conrad III with his chief nobleman are welcomed by Queen Melisende and her 18-year-old son, co-ruler Baldwin III at Jerusalem.
- June – Mu'in ad-Din Unur, Seljuk ruler (atabeg) of Damascus, prepares for war and strengthens the fortifications of the city. He sends an urgent request for military assistance to the Zangid ruler Sayf al-Din. Unur orders his troops to destroy the water sources in areas that the Crusaders must cross. Seljuk governors of frontier provinces station scouting parties along the road to Damascus.
- June 24 – Council of Acre: Conrad III, Louis VII, Melisende and many other nobles join in a war council near Acre. They decide that Damascus rather than Edessa will be the primary target of the Second Crusade.
- July – The Crusaders under Baldwin III join forces with the Crusader armies of Louis VII and Conrad III (all together some 50,000 men) at Tiberias. They march up the Jordan Valley and cross into Zangid territory.
- July 24 – Zangid forces under Sayf al-Din arrive at Homs. Mu'in al-Din Unur sends a letter of ultimatum to the Crusader leaders to lift the siege of Damascus. Meanwhile, guerrilla attacks demoralise the Crusaders.
- July 28 – Siege of Damascus: The Crusaders are forced to withdraw from their siege of Damascus after only four days. First Conrad III, then the rest of the Crusader army, decides to retreat to Jerusalem.
- September – The French crusaders raid the province of Damascus, in reprisal for the failure of their siege. Mu'in al-Din Unur takes his forces to the Hawran to protect the harvest and its transport to Damascus.
- September 8 – Conrad III sails from Acre to Thessaloniki and forms an alliance with Manuel I against King Roger II of Sicily. During his visit Henry II, Duke of Austria ('Jasomirgott') marries Manuel's niece, Theodora Komnene.

==== Europe ====
- February 1 – A small Crusader fleet of Genoese and English ships sets sail from Lisbon for the Holy Land. The Anglo-Flemish Crusader fleet takes Oran.
- Siege of Tortosa: A multinational force under Ramon Berenguer IV besieges the Almoravid city of Tortosa. After a 7-month siege the garrison surrenders.
- King Afonso I ("the Great") of Portugal takes Abrantes from the Almoravids. Ramon Berenguer IV conquers the lower Ebro plain (between 1148–1149).

==== England ====
- October – Queen Matilda returns to Normandy, partially due to her difficulties with the Catholic Church. Without the support of Robert of Gloucester her personal fight for the English throne is over.

==== Seljuk Empire ====
- Battle of Ghazni: Ghurid forces under Sayf al-Din Suri defeat the Ghaznavid sultan Bahram-Shah and capture the capital Ghazni. Bahram-Shah is forced to flee to India.

==== Africa ====
- Taking advantage of internal strife and a famine episode, George of Antioch takes Mahdia (June 22), Susa (July 1) and Sfax (July 12) in Tunisia, in the name of Roger II.
- Following the uprising of other cities in the region of Meknes (modern Morocco) under al-Massati, the population of Ceuta rebels against the Almohads.

=== By topic ===
==== Literature ====
- Anna Komnene writes the Alexiad, a biography of her father, the late Emperor Alexios I Komnenos.

==== Religion ====
- Hildegard of Bingen founds a new monastery at Rupertsberg in the Rhine Valley near Bingen am Rhein.

==== Technology ====
- An Italian silk industry is started at Palermo by Roger II, who takes numbers of silk workers back from Greece.

=== By place ===
==== Byzantine Empire ====
- Spring – Emperor Manuel I Komnenos recovers Corfu with the help of the Venetians, who defeat the Sicilian fleet. During the three-month siege, Byzantine admiral Stephen Kontostephanos is killed by a stone thrown by a catapult. Manuel prepares an offensive against the Normans; King Roger II sends a fleet (some 40 ships) under George of Antioch, to pillage the suburbs of Constantinople.

==== Levant ====
- Spring – Nur al-Din, Seljuk ruler (atabeg) of Aleppo, invades the Principality of Antioch and defeats the Crusaders under Raymond of Poitiers at Baghras. He moves southward to besiege the fortress of Inab, one of the few strongholds of the Crusaders east of the Orontes River. Raymond with a small army (supported by the Assassin allies under Ali ibn Wafa) hurries to its rescue. Nur al-Din, misinformed of the strength of the Crusader forces, retreats. In fact the Zangid forces (some 6,000 men) outnumber the Crusaders by over four to one. Against Ali's advice Raymond decides to reinforce the garrison of Inab.
- April – King Louis VII and Queen Eleanor of Aquitaine sail homeward in separate Sicilian ships. While the fleet rounds the Peloponnese (southern Greece) it is attacked by ships of the Byzantine navy. Louis gives orders to raise the French flag and is allowed to sail on. But the ships containing many of his followers and his possessions are captured and taken as a war-prize to Constantinople.
- June 29 – Battle of Inab: The Zangid army under Nur al-Din defeats the combined army of Raymond of Poitiers and the Assassins of Ali ibn Wafa at Inab. After the battle, Nur al-Din invades Antiochene territory and captures the fortresses of Artah and Harim. He then turns west to appear before the walls of Antioch itself and raids as far as St. Symeon.
- July – King Baldwin III receives an urgent request for help from Antioch to break the incomplete Zangid blockade of the city. Meanwhile, the Crusaders fail to retake Harim. Nur al-Din strengthens his siege of Antioch, but it is too large to surround. A truce is agreed under which Harim and farther east territory remains under Seljuk dominance.
- July 15 – The Church of the Holy Sepulchre in Jerusalem is consecrated, after reconstruction.

==== Europe ====
- The Italian 'naval republics' of Genoa, Pisa and Venice finance their expanding trade within and outside Europe – trade which includes an arms industry for manufactures and merchants alike (approximate date).
- October 24 – Ramon Berenguer IV, count of Barcelona, conquers Lleida from the Almoravids, after a siege of seven months (as well as Fraga and Mequinenza).
- Åhus, in present-day Sweden, gains city rights (approximate date).

==== Britain ====
- Spring – King Stephen besieges Worcester, but is unable to capture the castle due to its strong defences. He expels William de Beauchamp, lord of the city. Stephen builds two forts near the castle to assist in the attack.
- March – The 16-year-old Henry of Anjou, eldest son of Queen Matilda, lands in England in a second attempt to take the English throne from Stephen. He travels up via Salisbury and Gloucester north to Carlisle (Scotland).
- May 22 – Henry of Anjou is knighted at Carlisle by King David I. Henry acknowledges the Scottish king's right to Northumberland.

=== By topic ===
==== Commerce ====
- Genoa grants the benefits of a part of the city's fiscal revenues to a consortium of creditors called compera, the first example of the consolidation of public debt in medieval Europe.

==== Religion ====
- April 8 – Pope Eugene III takes refuge in the castle of Tusculum where he meets Louis VII and Eleanor of Aquitaine. He attempts to reunite the couple by insisting to restore the love between them.

== Significant people ==
- Kabua Kabua Jr. (Kuju)
- Pope Celestine II
- Pope Lucius II
- Pope Eugene III
- Al-Hafiz

== Births ==
1140

- May 28 – Xin Qiji, Chinese military leader (d. 1207)
- Adela of Champagne, queen of France (d. 1206)
- Alan Fitz Walter, Scottish High Steward (d. 1204)
- Cadfan ap Cadwaladr, Welsh nobleman (d. 1215)
- Davyd Rostislavich, Kievan Grand Prince (d. 1197)
- Domhnall Caomhánach, king of Leinster (d. 1175)
- Eliezer ben Joel HaLevi, German rabbi (d. 1225)
- Fujiwara no Tashi, Japanese empress (d. 1202)
- Gerard de Ridefort, Flemish Grand Master (d. 1189)
- Hedwig, margravine of Meissen (approximate date)
- Hugh de Paduinan, Norman nobleman (d. 1189)
- John I, archbishop of Trier (approximate date)
- John I, Norman nobleman (approximate date)
- John of Ford, English Cistercian abbot (d. 1224)
- Manfred II, marquess of Saluzzo (approximate date)
- Minamoto no Yoshihira, Japanese nobleman (d. 1160)
- Peter Waldo, French spiritual leader (d. 1205)
- Raymond III, crusader and count of Tripoli (d. 1187)
- Raymond the Palmer, Italian pilgrim (d. 1200)
- Simon II, duke of Lorraine (approximate date)
- Sophia of Minsk, queen of Denmark (d. 1198)
- Walter Map, Welsh clergyman and writer (d. 1210)
- William FitzRalph, English High Sheriff (d. 1200)
- Yuan Cai, Chinese scholar and official (d. 1195)

1141

- Malcolm IV, King of Scotland (d. 1165)
- Nizami Ganjavi, Persian poet (d. 1209) (Possibly 1140 or 1142)

1142

- Al-Mustadi, caliph of the Abbasid Caliphate (d. 1180)
- Fujiwara no Takanobu, Japanese portrait painter (d. 1205)
- Hugh III of Burgundy, French nobleman (approximate date)
- Moinuddin Chishti, Persian preacher and philosopher (d. 1236)
- Taklung Thangpa Tashi Pal, Tibetan Buddhist leader (d. 1210)
- William the Lion, king of Scotland (approximate date)

1143

- July 31 – Nijō, emperor of Japan (d. 1165)
- Balian of Ibelin, French nobleman (d. 1193)
- Beatrice I, Holy Roman Empress (d. 1184)
- Fujiwara no Motozane, Japanese waka poet (d. 1166)
- Jigten Sumgön, founder of the Drikung Kagyu (d. 1217)
- Konoe Motozane, Japanese nobleman (d. 1166)
- Mu'in al-Din Chishti, Persian preacher (d. 1236)
- Philip I (of Alsace), count of Flanders (d. 1191)

1144

- August 11 – Sinjong, Korean ruler of Goryeo (d. 1204)
- Li Fengniang, Chinese empress of the Song dynasty (d. 1200)
- Matsudono Motofusa, Japanese nobleman (d. 1230)
- Minamoto no Tomonaga, Japanese samurai (d. 1160)
- Taira no Tadanori, Japanese military leader (d. 1184)
- Approximate date – Maria Komnene, queen consort of Hungary and Croatia (d. 1190)

1145

- Al-Adil I, Ayyubid general and sultan (d. 1218)
- Adalbert III, archbishop of Salzburg (d. 1200)
- Adam of Perseigne, French Cistercian abbot (d. 1221)
- Aoife MacMurrough (or Eva), Irish princess (d. 1188)
- Baha ad-Din ibn Shaddad, Arab historian (d. 1234)
- Christina Hvide, queen of Sweden (approximate date)
- Elizabeth of Hungary, German duchess (d. 1189)
- Gregory IX, pope of the Catholic Church (d. 1241)
- Ibn Jubayr, Andalusian geographer and traveller (d. 1217)
- Margaret of Huntingdon, Scottish princess (d. 1201)
- Maria of Antioch, Byzantine empress and regent (d. 1182)
- Marie of Champagne, French noblewoman (d. 1198)
- Manuel Komnenos, son of Andronikos I (d. 1185)
- Najmuddin Kubra, founder of the Kubrawi order (d. 1221)
- Reginald FitzUrse, English knight and assassin (d. 1173)
- Ruben III, ruler of the Armenian Kingdom of Cilicia (d. 1187)
- Shihab al-Din 'Umar al-Suhrawardi, Persian scholar (d. 1234)
- Theodora Komnene, queen of Jerusalem (approximate date)

1146

- Abd al-Ghani al-Maqdisi, Arab scholar and jurist (d. 1203)
- Abu Musa al-Jazuli, Almohad philologian and writer (d. 1211)
- Fujiwara no Ikushi, Japanese empress and nun (d. 1173)
- Gerald of Wales, Welsh clergyman and chronicler (d. 1223)
- Walram I, German nobleman (House of Nassau) (d. 1198)

1147

- May 9 – Minamoto no Yoritomo, Japanese shogun (d. 1199)
- September 30 – Guang Zong, Chinese emperor (d. 1200)
- Abd al-Haqq I, ruler of the Marinid Sultanate (d. 1217)
- Garnier de Nablus, Syrian Grand Master (d. 1192)
- Haakon II Sigurdsson, king of Norway (d. 1162)
- Hugh de Kevilioc, 5th Earl of Chester (d. 1181)
- Ibn Qudamah, Umayyad theologian (d. 1223)
- Jetsun Dragpa Gyaltsen, Tibetan spiritual leader (d. 1216)
- Nicholas of Amiens, French theologian (d. 1200)
- Raimbaut d'Aurenga, French troubadour (d. 1173)
- Stephen III, king of Hungary and Croatia (d. 1172)
- Sukeko, Japanese princess and empress (d. 1216)
- Taira no Munemori, Japanese samurai (d. 1185)
- Wada Yoshimori, Japanese samurai (d. 1213)
- William Marshal, 1st Earl of Pembroke (d. 1219)

1148

- Béla III, king of Hungary and Croatia (d. 1196)
- Bohemond III ("the Child"), prince of Antioch (d. 1201)
- Galgano Guidotti, Italian knight and saint (d. 1181)
- Isabelle de Meulan, French noblewoman (d. 1220)
- Muhammad II, ruler of the Nizari Ismaili State (d. 1210)
- Ōe no Hiromoto, Japanese nobleman (d. 1225)
- Philippa of Antioch, princess of Antioch (d. 1178)
- Qiu Chuji, Chinese Taoist religious leader (d. 1227)
- Ugo Canefri, Italian knight and health worker (d. 1233)
- Urraca of Portugal, queen consort of León (d. 1211)

1149

- Albert of Vercelli, patriarch of Jerusalem (d. 1214)
- Al-Fa'iz bi-Nasr Allah, Fatimid caliph (d. 1160)
- Ch'oe Ch'ung-hŏn, Korean ruler of Goryeo (d. 1219)
- Fujiwara no Kanezane, Japanese nobleman (d. 1207)
- Majd al-Din ibn Athir, Zangid historian (d. 1210)
- Margaritus of Brindisi, Sicilian admiral (d. 1197)
- Minamoto no Michichika, Japanese nobleman (d. 1202)
- Muhammad of Ghor, ruler of the Ghurid Empire (d. 1206)
- Odon of Poznań, duke of Greater Poland (d. 1194)
- Shikishi, Japanese princess, poet and nun (d. 1201)

== Deaths ==
1140

- January 12 – Louis I, German nobleman
- February 6 – Thurstan, archbishop of York
- February 14
  - Leo I, prince of Armenia
  - Soběslav I, duke of Bohemia
- April 7 – Aibert, French monk and hermit (b. 1060)
- August 21 – Yang Zaixing, Chinese general
- August 31 – Godebold, bishop of Meissen
- September 15 – Adelaide, duchess consort of Bohemia
- November 16 – Wulgrin II, count of Angoulême
- Baldwin of Rieti, Italian Benedictine abbot
- Diego Gelmírez, Galician archbishop (b. 1069)
- Gaucherius, French priest and hermit (b. 1060)
- Hugh the Chanter, English historian and writer
- Kumarapala, Indian ruler of the Pala Empire
- Lhachen Naglug, Indian ruler of Ladakh (b. 1110)
- Li Gang, Chinese Grand Chancellor (b. 1083)
- Toba Sōjō, Japanese artist-monk (b. 1053)
- Wanyan Xiyin, Chinese chief adviser
- Approximate date – Honorius Augustodunensis, French theologian

1141

- February 11 – Hugh of Saint Victor, Saxon philosopher, theologian and mystic (b. c. 1078)
- February 13 – Béla II, King of Hungary and Croatia (b. c. 1109)
- April 12 or April 13 – Engelbert, Duke of Carinthia
- May – Aubrey de Vere II, Lord Great Chamberlain of England (b. 1062)
- June 10 – Richenza of Northeim, German empress (b. c. 1087/89)
- October 18 – Leopold, Duke of Bavaria (b. c. 1108)
- Sheikh Ahmad-e Jami, Persian Sufi writer, mystic and poet (b. 1048)
- Judah Halevi, Sephardi Jewish philosopher and poet (b. c. 1075)
- Alberich of Reims, Archbishop of Bourges (b. 1085)

1142

- January 4 – Clementia of Aquitaine, French noblewoman (b. 1060)
- January 16 – Eilika of Saxony, German noblewoman (b. 1080)
- January 28 – Yue Fei, Chinese military leader and poet (b. 1103)
- April 21 – Peter Abelard, French scholastic philosopher (b. 1079)
- June 25 – William of Montevergine, Italian abbot (b. 1085)
- June 28 – Guigues IV of Albon ("le Dauphin"), French nobleman
- July 27 – Berthold of Garsten, German priest and abbot (b. 1060)
- August 2 – Alexios Komnenos, Byzantine co-emperor (b. 1106)
- September 10 – Sancho de Larrosa, Spanish bishop
- Najm al-Din 'Umar al-Nasafi, Persian scholar and historian (b. 1067)
- Andronikos Komnenos, Byzantine prince (b. 1108)
- Arslan Shah I, Seljuk ruler of the Kerman Sultanate
- Conchobar Ua Briain, Irish king of Munster and Dublin
- Fujiwara no Mototoshi, Japanese nobleman (b. 1060)
- Orderic Vitalis, English monk and chronicler (b. 1075)
- Reverter de La Guardia, viscount of Barcelona (or 1144)

1143

- January 12 – Leo of Constantinople, Byzantine patriarch
- January 26 – Ali ibn Yusuf, ruler of the Almoravids (b. 1084)
- February 6 – Hugh II, Duke of Burgundy, French nobleman (b. 1084)
- April 8 – John II Komnenos, Byzantine emperor (b. 1087)
- April 18 – Gertrude of Süpplingenburg, German duchess and regent (b. 1115)
- June 24 – Ermesinde of Luxembourg, Countess of Namur, French noblewoman (b. 1080)
- August 2 – Muño Alfonso, Galician military leader
- September 23 – Pope Innocent II, pontiff of the Catholic Church
- September 24 – Agnes of Waiblingen, daughter of Henry IV (b. 1072)
- November 13 – Fulk (the Younger), king of Jerusalem
- December 24 – Miles of Gloucester, 1st Earl of Hereford, English nobleman
- Alexander of Telese, Italian chronicler and abbot
- Gilla Aenghus Ua Chlúmháin, Irish poet and writer
- Kakuban (Kogyo-Daishi), Japanese Buddhist priest (b. 1095)
- William of Malmesbury, English monk and historian
- Yelü Dashi, founder of the Qara Khitai (b. 1094)

1144

- March 8 – Celestine II, pope of the Catholic Church
- March 22 – William of Norwich, English child saint (b. 1132)
- May 23 – Petronilla of Lorraine, countess of Holland (b. 1082)
- June 12 – Al-Zamakhshari, Persian philosopher (b. 1075)
- July 17 – Abu Mansur Mauhub al-Jawaliqi, Arab philologist (b. 1074)
- July 27 – Salomea of Berg, High Duchess of Poland (b. 1099)
- September – Geoffrey de Mandeville, 1st Earl of Essex, English nobleman
- October 10 – Alfonso of Capua, Italo-Norman nobleman (b. 1120)
- December 24 – Hugh II (or Hugo), archbishop of Edessa
- Abu Tahir Marwazi, Persian philosopher and scientist
- Berenguer Ramon, Count of Provence, French nobleman (b. 1115)
- Matthew of Edessa (or Matteos), Armenian historian
- Rahere (or Raherius), Norman priest (approximate date)
- Reverter de La Guardia, viscount of Barcelona (or 1142)
- Zhu Bian, Chinese diplomat, poet and writer (b. 1085)

1145

- February 15 – Lucius II, pope of the Catholic Church
- March 23 – Tashfin ibn Ali, Almoravid emir
- April 5 – Gabriel II, patriarch of Alexandria
- October 6 – Baldwin, archbishop of Pisa
- November 26 – Bellinus of Padua, Italian bishop
- Fujiwara no Tamako, Japanese empress (b. 1101)
- Magnus Haraldsson, king of Norway (approximate date)
- Sophia of Bavaria, German noblewoman (b. 1105)
- William of Malines, Flemish priest (approximate date)
- Zhang Zeduan, Chinese landscape painter (b. 1085)

1146

- February 5 – Zafadola, Arab ruler of the Hudid Dynasty
- February 26 – Geoffrey de Gorham, Norman scholar
- April 14 – Gertrude of Sulzbach, German queen (b. 1110)
- June 1 – Ermengarde of Anjou, French duchess and regent
- August 1 – Vsevolod II, Grand Prince of Kiev (Rurik Dynasty)
- August 27 – Eric III, king of Denmark (House of Estridsen)
- September 14 – Imad ad-Din Zengi, Seljuk ruler of Syria
- September 15 – Alan, 1st Earl of Richmond ("the Black"), Breton noble
- Adam of Saint Victor, French Latin poet and composer
- Izz al-Din Husayn, Persian ruler of the Ghurid Dynasty
- Robert Pullen, English theologian (approximate date)
- Rodrigo Gómez, Castilian nobleman and military leader

1147

- January 13 – Robert de Craon, French Grand Master
- April 6 – Frederick II, German nobleman (b. 1090)
- April 9 – Conrad I, archbishop of Salzburg (b. 1075)
- July 31 – Hugh of Crécy, French nobleman
- September 19 – Igor II Olgovich, Kievan prince
- September – Fatimah Khatun, wife of caliph al-Muqtafi.
- October 31 – Robert FitzRoy, English nobleman
- December 25 – Guy II, French nobleman
- Agatha of Lorraine, French noblewoman
- Alan I, Viscount of Rohan (Alain le Noir), French nobleman (b. 1084)
- Comita II (or III), Italian ruler of Arborea
- Eleanor of Blois, French noblewoman
- Fannu, Almoravid princess and warrior
- Guido de Castro Ficeclo, Italian cardinal
- Hériman of Tournai, French chronicler
- Ibn Bassam, Andalusian poet and historian
- Ibrahim ibn Tashfin, Almoravid sultan
- John Capellanus, Scottish chancellor
- Martim Moniz, Portuguese nobleman
- Satake Masayoshi, Japanese samurai (b. 1081)
- William Fitz Duncan, Scottish prince

1148

- January 3 – Anselm of St. Saba, English bishop
- January 6
  - Gilbert de Clare, 1st Earl of Pembroke (b. 1100)
  - William de Warenne, 3rd Earl of Surrey (b. 1119)
- January 24 – Ascelin (or Anselm), English bishop
- April 16
  - Robert de Bethune, bishop of Hereford
  - Roger de Clinton, bishop of Coventry
- August 21 – William II, count of Nevers (b. 1089)
- September 17 – Conan III, duke of Brittany (b. 1095)
- September 30 – Magnús Einarsson, Icelandic bishop
- November 2 – Malachy, Irish archbishop and saint (b. 1094)
- Abu Bakr ibn al-Arabi, Andalusian scholar (b. 1076)
- Alberic of Ostia, French cardinal-bishop (b. 1080)
- Alfonso Jordan, count of Toulouse (b. 1103)
- Amadeus III, count of Savoy and Maurienne
- Ari Thorgilsson, Icelandic chronicler (b. 1067)
- Hedwig of Gudensberg, German countess (b. 1098)
- Henry of Lausanne, French monk and preacher
- Mahaut of Albon, countess of Savoy (b. 1112)
- Reginald III (or Renaud), count of Burgundy
- Roger III, duke of Apulia and Calabria (b. 1118)
- Simon of Vermandois, French bishop (b. 1093)
- William of St. Thierry, French abbot and writer
- Wuzhu, Chinese prince, general and minister
- Ye Mengde, Chinese minister and poet (b. 1077)

1149

- January 15 – Berengaria of Barcelona, queen of Castile (b. 1116)
- March 10 – Reginald I ("the One-Eyed"), count of Bar
- April 24 – Petronille de Chemillé, French abbess
- May 8 – Bernard du Bec, French Benedictine abbot
- June 29 – Raymond of Poitiers, prince of Antioch
- August 28 – Mu'in al-Din Unur, Seljuk ruler of Damascus
- September 30 – Arnaud de Lévezou, French archbishop
- October 8 – Al-Hafiz, caliph of the Fatimid Caliphate
- Joseph ibn Tzaddik, Spanish Jewish rabbi and poet
- Machig Labdrön, Tibetan Buddhist teacher (b. 1055)
- Pedro Helías, archbishop of Santiago de Compostela
- Qadi Ayyad, Almoravid imam and chief judge (b. 1083)
- Stephen Kontostephanos, Byzantine aristocrat (b. 1107)
