= 1140 =

1140 in various calendars
- Gregorian calendar: 1140; MCXL
- Ab urbe condita: 1893
- Armenian calendar: 589; ԹՎ ՇՁԹ
- Assyrian calendar: 5890
- Balinese saka calendar: 1061–1062
- Bengali calendar: 546–547
- Berber calendar: 2090
- English Regnal year: 5 Ste. 1 – 6 Ste. 1
- Buddhist calendar: 1684
- Burmese calendar: 502
- Byzantine calendar: 6648–6649
- Chinese calendar: 己未年 (Earth Goat); 3837 or 3630 — to — 庚申年 (Metal Monkey); 3838 or 3631
- Coptic calendar: 856–857
- Discordian calendar: 2306
- Ethiopian calendar: 1132–1133
- Hebrew calendar: 4900–4901
- Hindu calendars
- Vikram Samvat: 1196–1197
- Shaka Samvat: 1061–1062
- Kali Yuga: 4240–4241
- Holocene calendar: 11140
- Igbo calendar: 140–141
- Iranian calendar: 518–519
- Islamic calendar: 534–535
- Japanese calendar: Hōen 6 (保延６年)
- Javanese calendar: 1046–1047
- Julian calendar: 1140; MCXL
- Korean calendar: 3473
- Minguo calendar: 772 before ROC 民前772年
- Nanakshahi calendar: −328
- Seleucid era: 1451/1452 AG
- Thai solar calendar: 1682–1683
- Tibetan calendar: ས་མོ་ལུག་ལོ་ (female Earth-Sheep); 1266 or 885 or 113 — to — ལྕགས་ཕོ་སྤྲེ་ལོ་ (male Iron-Monkey); 1267 or 886 or 114

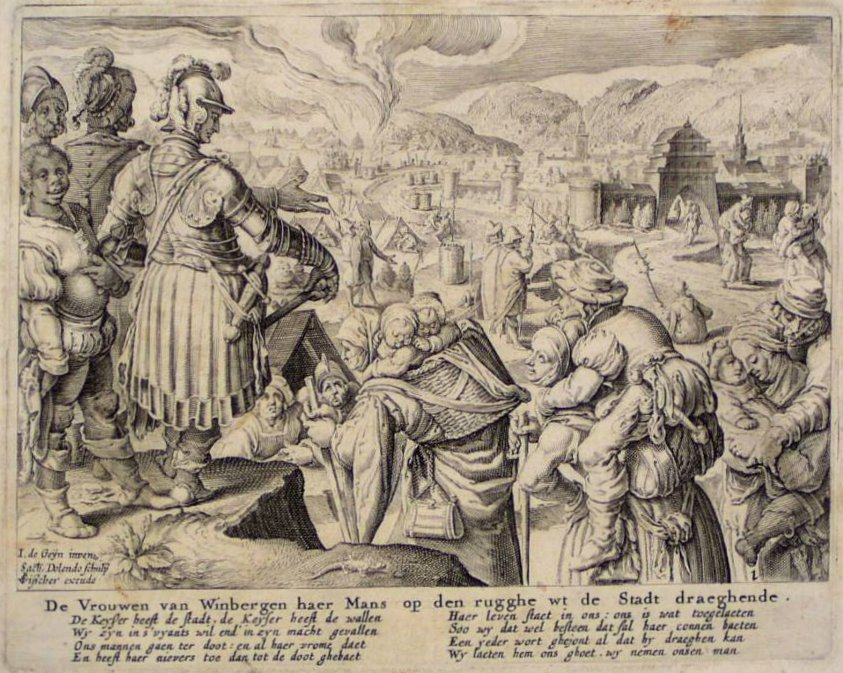
Conrad III at the Siege of Weinsberg

Year 1140 (MCXL) was a leap year starting on Monday of the Julian calendar.

== Events ==
=== By place ===
==== Levant ====
- Spring – King Fulk of Jerusalem confronts Imad al-Din Zengi, Seljuk ruler (atabeg) of Mosul, near Dara'a in southern Syria. Turkish forces under Mu'in al-Din (supported by the Crusaders) besiege Banias.

==== Europe ====
- Spring – King Conrad III enfeoffs Henry II ("Jasomirgott"), a member of the House of Babenberg, with the County Palatine of the Rhine (belonging to the Holy Roman Empire).
- Summer – King Roger II promulgates the Assizes of Ariano (a series of laws to rule the Norman Kingdom of Sicily) after the pacification of southern Italy.
- December 21 – Siege of Weinsberg: Conrad III captures the castle at Weinsberg during the civil war between the Staufers and the Welfs in Germany.

==== England and Scotland ====
- Summer – King Stephen appoints Geoffrey de Mandeville as Earl of Essex for his support during the civil war against Matilda (Stephen's cousin).
- The town of Lanark in Scotland is made a Royal Burgh by King David I, giving it merchant privileges relating to government and taxation.

==== Asia ====
- August 21 – Jin–Song Wars – Battle of Yancheng: Chinese forces under the command of Yue Fei defeat a numerically superior Jin army led by Wuzhu.

=== By topic ===
==== Religion ====
- June 3 – Pierre Abelard, a French theologian, is condemned for heresy by the Council of Sens. He sets out for Rome to present his defense to Pope Innocent II.
- September 8 – Sephardi Jewish philosopher Judah Halevi, having completed the Kuzari, arrives in Alexandria on a pilgrimage to Palestine.
- The first Cistercian monastery in Spain is founded in Fitero. The order enjoys a rapid expansion in the region in the following 15 years.

==== Literature ====
- Gratian, an Italian monk and canon lawyer, founds the science of Canon law with the publication of the Decretum Gratiani (approximate date).

== Births ==
- May 28 – Xin Qiji, Chinese military leader (d. 1207)
- Adela of Champagne, queen of France (d. 1206)
- Alan Fitz Walter, Scottish High Steward (d. 1204)
- Cadfan ap Cadwaladr, Welsh nobleman (d. 1215)
- Davyd Rostislavich, Kievan Grand Prince (d. 1197)
- Domhnall Caomhánach, king of Leinster (d. 1175)
- Eliezer ben Joel HaLevi, German rabbi (d. 1225)
- Fujiwara no Tashi, Japanese empress (d. 1202)
- Gerard de Ridefort, Flemish Grand Master (d. 1189)
- Hedwig, margravine of Meissen (approximate date)
- Hugh de Paduinan, Norman nobleman (d. 1189)
- John I, archbishop of Trier (approximate date)
- John I, Norman nobleman (approximate date)
- John of Ford, English Cistercian abbot (d. 1224)
- Manfred II, marquess of Saluzzo (approximate date)
- Minamoto no Yoshihira, Japanese nobleman (d. 1160)
- Peter Waldo, French spiritual leader (d. 1205)
- Raymond III, crusader and count of Tripoli (d. 1187)
- Raymond the Palmer, Italian pilgrim (d. 1200)
- Simon II, duke of Lorraine (approximate date)
- Sophia of Minsk, queen of Denmark (d. 1198)
- Walter Map, Welsh clergyman and writer (d. 1210)
- William FitzRalph, English High Sheriff (d. 1200)
- Yuan Cai, Chinese scholar and official (d. 1195)

== Deaths ==
- January 12 – Louis I, German nobleman
- February 6 – Thurstan, archbishop of York
- February 14
  - Leo I, prince of Armenia
  - Soběslav I, duke of Bohemia
- April 7 – Aibert, French monk and hermit (b. 1060)
- August 21 – Yang Zaixing, Chinese general
- August 31 – Godebold, bishop of Meissen
- September 15 – Adelaide, duchess consort of Bohemia
- November 16 – Wulgrin II, count of Angoulême
- Baldwin of Rieti, Italian Benedictine abbot
- Diego Gelmírez, Galician archbishop (b. 1069)
- Gaucherius, French priest and hermit (b. 1060)
- Hugh the Chanter, English historian and writer
- Kumarapala, Indian ruler of the Pala Empire
- Lhachen Naglug, Indian ruler of Ladakh (b. 1110)
- Li Gang, Chinese Grand Chancellor (b. 1083)
- Toba Sōjō, Japanese artist-monk (b. 1053)
- Wanyan Xiyin, Chinese chief adviser
- Approximate date – Honorius Augustodunensis, French theologian
