= 1147 =

1147 in various calendars
- Gregorian calendar: 1147; MCXLVII
- Ab urbe condita: 1900
- Armenian calendar: 596; ԹՎ ՇՂԶ
- Assyrian calendar: 5897
- Balinese saka calendar: 1068–1069
- Bengali calendar: 553–554
- Berber calendar: 2097
- English Regnal year: 12 Ste. 1 – 13 Ste. 1
- Buddhist calendar: 1691
- Burmese calendar: 509
- Byzantine calendar: 6655–6656
- Chinese calendar: 丙寅年 (Fire Tiger); 3844 or 3637 — to — 丁卯年 (Fire Rabbit); 3845 or 3638
- Coptic calendar: 863–864
- Discordian calendar: 2313
- Ethiopian calendar: 1139–1140
- Hebrew calendar: 4907–4908
- Hindu calendars
- Vikram Samvat: 1203–1204
- Shaka Samvat: 1068–1069
- Kali Yuga: 4247–4248
- Holocene calendar: 11147
- Igbo calendar: 147–148
- Iranian calendar: 525–526
- Islamic calendar: 541–542
- Japanese calendar: Kyūan 3 (久安３年)
- Javanese calendar: 1053–1054
- Julian calendar: 1147; MCXLVII
- Korean calendar: 3480
- Minguo calendar: 765 before ROC 民前765年
- Nanakshahi calendar: −321
- Seleucid era: 1458/1459 AG
- Thai solar calendar: 1689–1690
- Tibetan calendar: མེ་ཕོ་སྟག་ལོ་ (male Fire-Tiger); 1273 or 892 or 120 — to — མེ་མོ་ཡོས་ལོ་ (female Fire-Hare); 1274 or 893 or 121

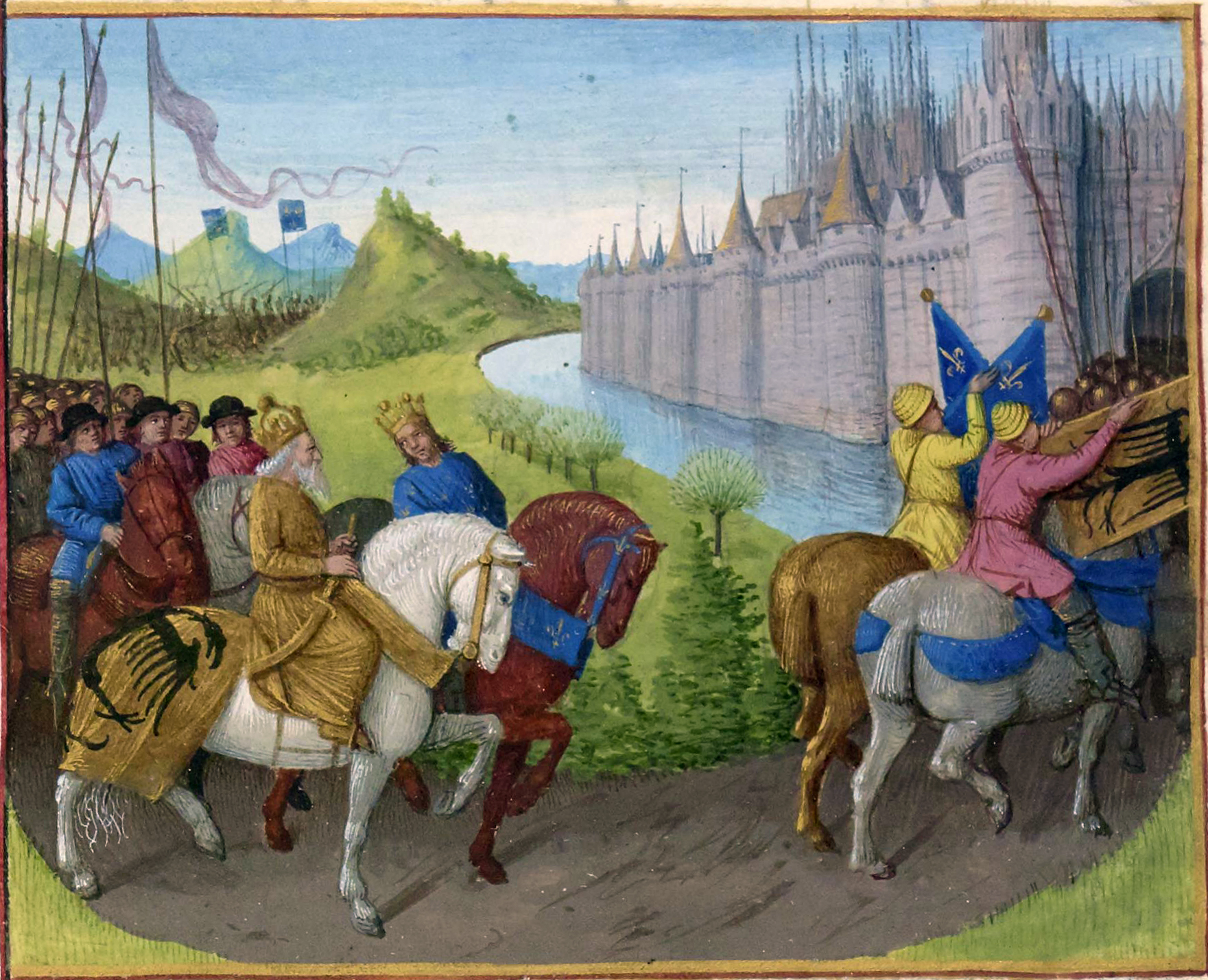
Conrad III arrives at Constantinople

Year 1147 (MCXLVII) was a common year starting on Wednesday of the Julian calendar.

== Events ==
=== By place ===
==== Second Crusade ====
- Late spring – An expedition of Crusaders and Englishmen, together with forces from Flanders, Frisia, Scotland and some German polities, leaves from Dartmouth in England for the Holy Land. Leadership is provided by Hervey de Glanvill, a Norman nobleman and constable of Suffolk, who leads a fleet of some 200 ships. Bad weather forces them to take refuge at the mouth of the Douro River, on the Portuguese coast, on June 16.
- May – July – A German expeditionary force (some 20,000 men) under King Conrad III leaves Regensburg and passes into Hungary. The German nobility is headed by Conrad's nephew and heir, Frederick I, duke of Swabia. On July 20, Conrad crosses into the Byzantine Empire, and reaches Sofia – where Michael Palaiologos (a nephew of Emperor Manuel I) gives Conrad an official welcome and provides the Crusaders with food.
- June – A French expeditionary force (some 18,000 men) led by King Louis VII departs from Metz and travels through Bavaria. Louis is accompanied by the French nobility and his wife, Queen Eleanor of Aquitaine, heiress of France. At Regensburg, where the force arrives on June 29, the Crusaders journey peaceably for fifteen days through Hungary and reach the Byzantine frontier at the end of August.
- July 1–October 25 – Siege of Lisbon: King Afonso I of Portugal conquers Lisbon from the Taifa of Badajoz after a four-month siege, with support of English, Flemish and German Crusaders. The garrison surrenders on the guarantee that their lives will be spared. The Crusaders break the terms and take part in a bloody massacre. Afonso rules from his capital at Coimbra, takes Sintra and Santarém, and sacks Palmela.
- September 7 – The German crusaders suffer a natural disaster near Constantinople, when part of their encampment is swept away by a flash flood with considerable loss of life. Emperor Manuel I Komnenos orders the Crusaders to cross to Asia Minor by the Hellespont. Conrad III ignores the advice of Manuel and after some minor clashes with the Byzantines, pushes towards Constantinople.
- September 10 – The German crusaders under Conrad III reach Constantinople, where there is a frosty exchange of letters between Conrad and Manuel I. The German forces make camp at Galata on the northern shore of the Golden Horn. Manuel orders that a full-scale effort must be made to transport the Germans, who are causing troubles by sacking the Philopatium, across the Bosporus.
- Autumn – Conrad III decides not to wait for the French and crosses the Bosporus into Asia Minor. He leads the German crusader army to Nicomedia, and divides his forces into two divisions. Conrad takes the knights and his professional soldiers across Seljuk central territory while the baggage train, pilgrims and a defending force under Bishop Otto of Freising travel along the Aegean coast.
- October 4–5 – Louis VII arrives at Constantinople and joins with forces from Savoy under Amadeus III (his uncle) – who have taken the land route through Italy. Louis crosses the Bosporus, and leads the French crusader army into Asia Minor – where he hears in Nicaea of Conrad's defeat at the end of October. Louis sends a military escort for Conrad and agrees to rendezvous at Lopardium. The German crusaders under Otto of Freising follow the coastal road before turning inland, up the Gediz River valley to Philadelphia. Otto's force is ambushed by the Seljuk Turks, just outside Laodicea, losing many men killed or taken prisoner. Otto and the survivors struggle on to Adalia, from where they sail for the Holy Land. Others attempt to continue along the southern coast of Anatolia.
- October 25 – Battle of Dorylaeum: The German crusaders under Conrad III are defeated by the Seljuk Turks led by Sultan Mesud I. Conrad is forced to turn back and is wounded by arrows during the retreat to Nicaea. In Seljuk territory the Crusaders are harassed all the way and demoralised by the intensified attacks. Many of the weakest people fall behind and are captured by the Muslims.
- November – The combined forces of Louis VII and Conrad III meet at Lopardium and march along the coastal road via Pergamon and Smyrna to Ephesus, where they celebrate Christmas. Conrad, still suffering from his wounds, sails back to Constantinople to be placed under the care of Manuel's own physicians. Meanwhile, the Crusader camp is attacked by Turkish raiders near Ephesus.
- December 24 – Battle of Ephesus: The French crusaders under Louis VII leave Ephesus, and ascend the Meander Valley. Louis is warned by messengers of Manuel that Seljuk and Danishmendid forces are assembling west of Adalia. Louis ignores the advice and successfully fends off an ambush just outside Ephesus.

==== Europe ====
- April 13 – Pope Eugene III issues a bull (known as the Divina dispensatione), permitting Conrad III to attack the Polabian Slavs (or Wends) under the spiritual guidance of Bishop Anselm of Havelberg. The Crusaders are allowed to wear sacred crosses, and Bernard of Clairvaux instructs the Germans how to treat the Slavs under their control. "With God's help", says the abbot, "they shall be either converted or slaughtered".
- June – The Wendish Crusade: An expedition of Crusaders – composed of Germans, Saxons and Danes – expels the Obotrites from Wagria (Schleswig-Holstein). Two Danish fleets led by King Canute V in alliance with co-ruler Sweyn III, ravage the northern coast. The countryside of Mecklenburg and Pommerania is plundered and depopulated with much bloodshed, especially by German forces under Henry the Lion.
- July 17 – King Alfonso VII of León and Castile, leads a campaign at the head of mixed armies of Catalonia, Genoa, Pisa and France. He besieges Almería in southern Al-Andalus (modern Spain); a Genoese fleet of 63 galleys and 163 other vessels, blockade the Almoravid-held port, which is captured after a 2-month siege on October 17.
- A Sicilian fleet (some 70 ships) under George of Antioch attacks Corfu, the island surrenders and welcomes the Normans as their liberators. Leaving a garrison of 1,000 men, George sails to the Peloponnesus. He pillages the cities of Corinth, Athens and Thebes. King Roger II begins an 11-year war between Sicily and the Byzantine Empire.
- The first known reference to Moscow as a meeting place of Rurikid princes Yuri Dolgoruky and Sviatoslav Olgovich.

==== Levant ====
- May–June – Nur al-Din, Seljuk ruler (atabeg) of Aleppo, signs a peace treaty with Mu'in al-Din Unur. As part of the agreement, he marries Mu'in al-Din's daughter Ismat al-Din Khatun. Together Mu'in al-Din and Nur al-Din besiege the fortresses of Bosra and Salkhad, which has been captured by rebellious Muslim forces.
- Battle of Bosra: A Crusader force under King Baldwin III fights an inconclusive battle against Seljuk forces from Damascus led by Mu'in al-Din aided by Nur al-Din's contingents from Aleppo and Mosul. Baldwin retreats to Jerusalem, while the Seljuk Turks attack his rearguard and stragglers underway back to Palestine.

==== Africa ====
- Spring – The Almohads under Abd al-Mu'min destroy the Almoravid Empire. They capture Marrakesh and kill the last emir, Ishaq ibn Ali. Abd al-Mu'min orders the elimination of 30,000 Almoravids in a purge.
- The Siculo-Normans take control of Gabes (modern Tunisia).

=== By topic ===
==== Religion ====
- Spring – Eugene III leaves Viterbo and travels to France. At the start of April he meets Louis VII at Dijon. It is agreed that Abbot Suger, Louis' adviser, governs France while Louis is away.
- Congregation of Savigny is affiliated to the Cistercians.

== Births ==
- May 9 – Minamoto no Yoritomo, Japanese shogun (d. 1199)
- September 30 – Guang Zong, Chinese emperor (d. 1200)
- Abd al-Haqq I, ruler of the Marinid Sultanate (d. 1217)
- Garnier de Nablus, Syrian Grand Master (d. 1192)
- Haakon II Sigurdsson, king of Norway (d. 1162)
- Hugh de Kevilioc, 5th Earl of Chester (d. 1181)
- Ibn Qudamah, Umayyad theologian (d. 1223)
- Jetsun Dragpa Gyaltsen, Tibetan spiritual leader (d. 1216)
- Nicholas of Amiens, French theologian (d. 1200)
- Raimbaut d'Aurenga, French troubadour (d. 1173)
- Stephen III, king of Hungary and Croatia (d. 1172)
- Sukeko, Japanese princess and empress (d. 1216)
- Taira no Munemori, Japanese samurai (d. 1185)
- Wada Yoshimori, Japanese samurai (d. 1213)
- William Marshal, 1st Earl of Pembroke (d. 1219)

== Deaths ==
- January 13 – Robert de Craon, French Grand Master
- April 6 – Frederick II, German nobleman (b. 1090)
- April 9 – Conrad I, archbishop of Salzburg (b. 1075)
- July 31 – Hugh of Crécy, French nobleman
- September 19 – Igor II Olgovich, Kievan prince
- September – Fatimah Khatun, wife of caliph al-Muqtafi.
- October 31 – Robert FitzRoy, English nobleman
- December 25 – Guy II, French nobleman
- Agatha of Lorraine, French noblewoman
- Alan I, Viscount of Rohan (Alain le Noir), French nobleman (b. 1084)
- Comita II (or III), Italian ruler of Arborea
- Eleanor of Blois, French noblewoman
- Fannu, Almoravid princess and warrior
- Guido de Castro Ficeclo, Italian cardinal
- Hériman of Tournai, French chronicler
- Ibn Bassam, Andalusian poet and historian
- Ibrahim ibn Tashfin, Almoravid sultan
- John Capellanus, Scottish chancellor
- Martim Moniz, Portuguese nobleman
- Satake Masayoshi, Japanese samurai (b. 1081)
- William fitz Duncan, Scottish prince
