= Saint Baldwin =

Saint Baldwin may refer to:

- Baldwin of Laon (died 679), archdeacon of Laon, brother of Anstrudis
- Baldwin of Rieti (died 1140), Benedictine abbot
- Baldwin of Boucle (died 1205), Benedictine hermit at Klein-Sinaai
