= 1200 =

1200 in various calendars
- Gregorian calendar: 1200; MCC
- Ab urbe condita: 1953
- Armenian calendar: 649; ԹՎ ՈԽԹ
- Assyrian calendar: 5950
- Balinese saka calendar: 1121–1122
- Bengali calendar: 606–607
- Berber calendar: 2150
- English Regnal year: 1 Joh. 1 – 2 Joh. 1
- Buddhist calendar: 1744
- Burmese calendar: 562
- Byzantine calendar: 6708–6709
- Chinese calendar: 己未年 (Earth Goat); 3897 or 3690 — to — 庚申年 (Metal Monkey); 3898 or 3691
- Coptic calendar: 916–917
- Discordian calendar: 2366
- Ethiopian calendar: 1192–1193
- Hebrew calendar: 4960–4961
- Hindu calendars
- Vikram Samvat: 1256–1257
- Shaka Samvat: 1121–1122
- Kali Yuga: 4300–4301
- Holocene calendar: 11200
- Igbo calendar: 200–201
- Iranian calendar: 578–579
- Islamic calendar: 596–597
- Japanese calendar: Shōji 2 (正治２年)
- Javanese calendar: 1108–1109
- Julian calendar: 1200; MCC
- Korean calendar: 3533
- Minguo calendar: 712 before ROC 民前712年
- Nanakshahi calendar: −268
- Thai solar calendar: 1742–1743
- Tibetan calendar: ས་མོ་ལུག་ལོ་ (female Earth-Sheep); 1326 or 945 or 173 — to — ལྕགས་ཕོ་སྤྲེ་ལོ་ (male Iron-Monkey); 1327 or 946 or 174

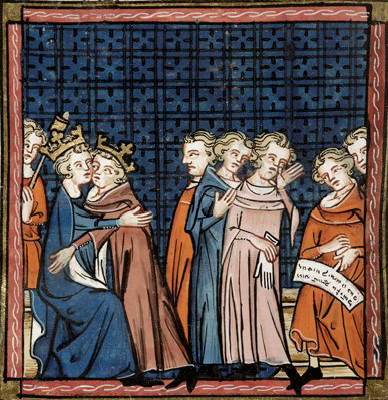
Philip II (August) and John (Lacklandال) making peace during the Angevin War.

1200 (MCC) was a leap year starting on Saturday of the Julian calendar, the 1200th year of the Common Era (CE) and Anno Domini (AD) designations, the 200th year of the 2nd millennium, the 100th and last year of the 12th century, and the 1st year of the 1200s decade. As of the start of 1200, the Gregorian calendar was 7 days ahead of the Julian calendar, which was the dominant calendar of the time.

The Proleptic Gregorian calendar called it a century leap year.

== Events ==
=== By place ===
==== Europe ====
- Spring – Boniface I, Marquis of Montferrat, sends envoys to Venice, Genoa and other city-states to negotiate a contract for transport to the Levant. Meanwhile, Boniface and various nobles are mustering an expeditionary army (mainly forces from France and the Holy Roman Empire) at Paris. On February 23, Baldwin IX, count of Flanders and his brother Henry of Flanders take the cross at Bruges (modern Belgium), and agree to take part in the Fourth Crusade called by Pope Innocent III (see 1199).
- May 22 – The Kings John of England and Philip II of France, sign a peace treaty at Le Goulet, an island in the middle of the Seine River, near Vernon in Normandy. The agreement recognizes John as overlord of most of the English owned lands in France, but John has to give Philip the lands of Norman Vexin and Évreux and a large sum of money (some 20,000 marks) – a "relief" payment for recognition of John's sovereignty of Brittany.
- August 25 – Eager to make peace with Aymer Taillefer, count of Angoulême, John marries 15-year-old Isabella of Angoulême at Bordeaux. In order to remarry, John needs to abandon his first wife, Isabella of Gloucester. John accomplishes this by arguing that he has failed to get the necessary papal dispensation to marry Isabella of Gloucester.
- The rebel leader Ivanko is captured and executed by the Byzantine general Alexios Palaiologos (son-in-law of Emperor Alexios III Angelos).

==== Britain ====
- November 22 – During a tour of the Midlands, John receives homage from William the Lion, king of Scotland, at Lincoln. William is looking to move into the areas of Northumberland, Cumberland, and Westmoreland. John on the other hand ensures that these areas are controlled by English nobles he can trust.

==== Levant ====
- February 17 – Al-Adil I, Ayyubid ruler of Damascus, Jerusalem, and parts of the Jazira takes control of Egypt, and is recognized as sultan of the Ayyubid Empire. During his reign, he promotes trade and good relations with the Crusader states. His son Al-Kamil becomes the effective ruler (viceroy) of Egypt.

==== Asia ====
- Temüjin (or Genghis Khan) manages to unite about half the feuding Mongol clans under his leadership. He delegates authority based on skill and loyalty, rather than tribal affiliation or family. The main rivals of the Mongol confederation are the Naimans to the west, the Merkits to the north, the Tanguts to the south and the Jin Dynasty (or Great Jin) to the east.

=== By topic ===
==== Education ====
- The University of Paris receives its charter, from Philip II. He issues a diploma "for the security of the scholars of Paris", which affirms that students are subject only to ecclesiastical jurisdiction.

== Births ==
- January 19 – Dōgen Zenji, founder of the Sōtō Zen school (d. 1253)
- January – Theobald le Botiller, Norman nobleman and knight (d. 1230)
- September – Philip I, French prince and nobleman (House of Capet) (d. 1235)
- October 9 – Isabel Marshal, English countess and regent (d. 1240)
- October 22 – Louis IV (the Saint), landgrave of Thuringia (d. 1227)
- unknown dates
- Alix (or Alis), Breton noblewoman (House of Thouars) (d. 1221)
- Ingerd Jakobsdatter, Danish noblewoman and landowner (d. 1258)
- Ulrich von Liechtenstein, German minnesinger and poet (d. 1275)
- probable
  - Adam Marsh, English Franciscan scholar and theologian (d. 1259)
  - Chen Rong (Ch'en Jung), Chinese painter and politician (d. 1266)
  - Jutta of Kulmsee, German noblewoman, hermit and saint (d. 1260)
  - Matthew Paris, English Benedictine monk and chronicler (d. 1259)
  - Rolandino of Padua, Italian professor, jurist and writer (d. 1276)
  - Rudolf von Ems, German nobleman, knight and poet (d. 1254)

== Deaths ==
- January 13 – Otto I, German nobleman (House of Hohenstaufen)
- January 14 – Odo of Novara, Italian priest and saint (b. 1105)
- January 20 – Odo of Canterbury, English abbot and theologian
- February 6
  - Kajiwara Kagesue, Japanese nobleman (b. 1162)
  - Kajiwara Kagetoki, Japanese samurai and spy
- April 8 – Adalbert III (or Vojtěch), German archbishop (b. 1145)
- April 23 – Zhu Xi, Chinese historian and philosopher (b. 1130)
- May 25 – Nicholas I, German nobleman (House of Mecklenburg)
- July 16 – Li Fengniang (or Cixian), Chinese empress (b. 1144)
- July 26 – Raymond of Piacenza (the Palmer), Italian pilgrim
- September 19 – Alberic III of Dammartin, French nobleman
- September 17 – Guang Zong, Chinese emperor (b. 1147)
- September 24 – Heinrich Walpot, German Grand Master
- October 25 – Conrad of Wittelsbach, German archbishop
- November 16 – Hugh of Avalon, French monk and bishop
- December 12 – Lochlann of Galloway, Scottish nobleman
- December 14 – Han (or Gongshu), Chinese empress (b. 1165)
- Adachi Morinaga, Japanese Buddhist warrior monk (b. 1135)
- Benedicta Ebbesdotter of Hvide, queen of Sweden (or 1199)
- Gilbert Horal, Spanish Grand Master of the Knights Templar
- Inpumon'in no Tayū, Japanese noblewoman and poet (b. 1130)
- Joel ben Isaac ha-Levi, German rabbi and Tosafist (b. 1115)
- Liu Wansu, Chinese physician of the Jin Dynasty (b. 1110)
- Nicholas of Amiens, French theologian and writer (b. 1147)
- Nigel de Longchamps, English satirist (approximate date)
- Osbern of Gloucester, English lexicographical writer (b. 1123)
- William FitzRalph, English nobleman and knight (b. 1140)
