= 1060 =

1060 in various calendars
- Gregorian calendar: 1060; MLX
- Ab urbe condita: 1813
- Armenian calendar: 509; ԹՎ ՇԹ
- Assyrian calendar: 5810
- Balinese saka calendar: 981–982
- Bengali calendar: 466–467
- Berber calendar: 2010
- English Regnal year: N/A
- Buddhist calendar: 1604
- Burmese calendar: 422
- Byzantine calendar: 6568–6569
- Chinese calendar: 己亥年 (Earth Pig); 3757 or 3550 — to — 庚子年 (Metal Rat); 3758 or 3551
- Coptic calendar: 776–777
- Discordian calendar: 2226
- Ethiopian calendar: 1052–1053
- Hebrew calendar: 4820–4821
- Hindu calendars
- Vikram Samvat: 1116–1117
- Shaka Samvat: 981–982
- Kali Yuga: 4160–4161
- Holocene calendar: 11060
- Igbo calendar: 60–61
- Iranian calendar: 438–439
- Islamic calendar: 451–452
- Japanese calendar: Kōhei 3 (康平３年)
- Javanese calendar: 963–964
- Julian calendar: 1060; MLX
- Korean calendar: 3393
- Minguo calendar: 852 before ROC 民前852年
- Nanakshahi calendar: −408
- Seleucid era: 1371/1372 AG
- Thai solar calendar: 1602–1603
- Tibetan calendar: ས་མོ་ཕག་ལོ་ (female Earth-Boar); 1186 or 805 or 33 — to — ལྕགས་ཕོ་བྱི་བ་ལོ་ (male Iron-Rat); 1187 or 806 or 34

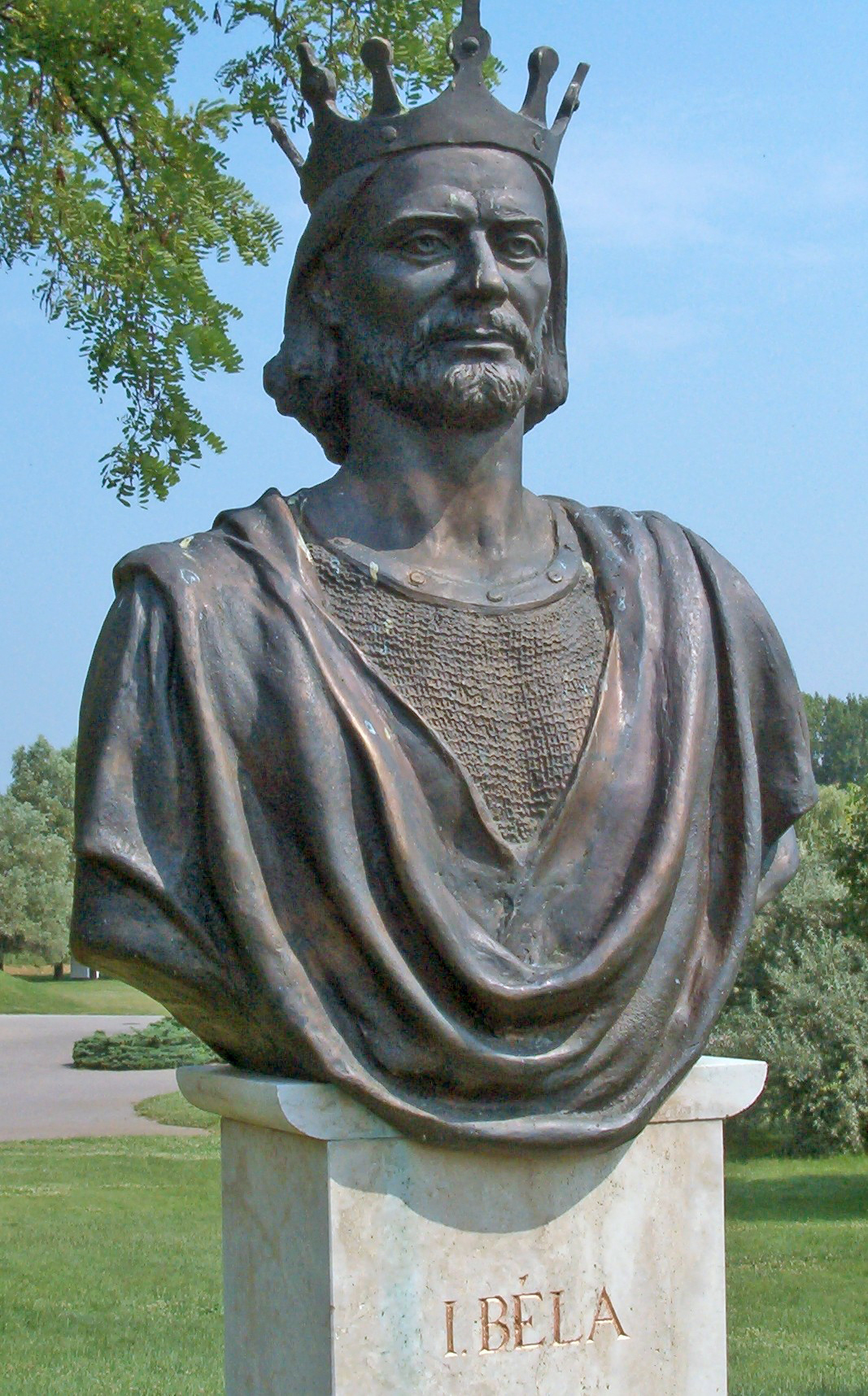
King Béla I of Hungary (c. 1015–1063)

Year 1060 (MLX) was a leap year starting on Saturday of the Julian calendar. It was the 1060th year of the Common Era (CE) and Anno Domini (AD) designations, the 60th year of the 2nd millennium, the 60th year of the 11th century, and the first year of the 1060s decade.

== Events ==
=== By place ===
==== Europe ====
- August 4 – King Henry I of France (of the House of Capet) dies after a 29-year reign in Vitry-aux-Loges. He is succeeded by his 8-year-old son Philip I ("the Amorous") as king of France. Philip is too young to rule, and his mother, Queen Anne of Kiev becomes regent. France is administered by Count Baldwin V (one of Philip's uncles) who acts as co-regent.
- Summer – Norman forces under Duke Robert Guiscard invade Apulia, and capture the cities of Taranto and Brindisi (under control of the Byzantine Empire). Guiscard prepares a Sicilian expedition against the Saracens and returns to Calabria (Southern Italy), where his brother Roger Bosso waits with siege engines.
- December 6 – Béla I ("the Champion") is crowned king of Hungary after his nephew, Solomon is deprived of the crown. He is supported by Duke Bolesław II the Generous – who helps him (with Polish troops) to obtain the Hungarian throne.

==== China ====
- The compilation of the New Book of Tang is completed, under a team of scholars led by Ouyang Xiu.

==== Middle East ====
- August 30 – The Mirdasids under Mahmud ibn Nasr defeat the Fatimid Caliphate's army under Nasir al-Dawla Ibn Hamdan at the Battle of al-Funaydiq, leading to the definitive loss of Aleppo for the Fatimids.

=== By topic ===
==== Religion ====
- Anselm enters the Benedictine Bec Abbey in Normandy, as a novice (approximate date).

== Births ==
- February 9 – Honorius II, pope of the Catholic Church (d. 1130)
- September 18 – Godfrey of Bouillon, French nobleman (d. 1100)
- September 22 – Vitalis of Savigny, Catholic saint and itinerant preacher (d. 1122)
- Ava (or Ava of Göttweig), German poet (approximate date)
- Aibert (or Aybert), French monk and hermit (d. 1140)
- Bernard degli Uberti, bishop of Parma (approximate date)
- Berthold I, German nobleman (approximate date)
- Berthold of Garsten, German priest and abbot (d. 1142)
- Brahmadeva, Indian mathematician (d. 1130)
- Clementia of Aquitaine, French noblewoman (d. 1142)
- Diarmait Ua Briain, king of Munster (d. 1118)
- Duncan II, king of Scotland (approximate date)
- Constantius Ducas, Byzantine emperor (d. 1081)
- Diemoth (or Diemudis), German nun and writer (d. 1130)
- Egbert II, German nobleman (approximate date)
- Erard I, French nobleman (approximate date)
- Fujiwara no Mototoshi, Japanese nobleman (d. 1142)
- Gaucherius, French priest and hermit (d. 1140)
- Godfrey I, count of Louvain (approximate date)
- Goswin I, count of Heinsberg (approximate date)
- Gregory of Catino, Italian monk and historian
- Hamelin de Ballon, Norman nobleman (approximate date)
- Herman II, margrave of Baden (approximate date)
- Hui Zong, Chinese emperor (Western Xia) (d. 1086)
- Mafalda of Pulla-Calabria, Norman noblewoman (d. 1108)
- Odo of Tournai, bishop of Cambrai (d. 1113)
- Odo I (the Red), duke of Burgundy (d. 1102)
- Olegarius, archbishop of Tarragona (d. 1137)
- Ranulf Flambard, bishop of Durham (d. 1128)
- Richard of Salerno, Norman nobleman (approximate date)
- Roger Borsa, Norman nobleman (or 1061)
- Stephen Harding, English abbot (approximate date)
- Tokushi, Japanese empress consort (d. 1114)
- Walo II (or Galon II), French nobleman (d. 1098)

== Deaths ==
- January 18 – Duduc (or Dudoc), bishop of Wells
- May 12 – Matilda, duchess of Swabia (d. 1048)
- August 4 – Henry I, king of France (b. 1008)
- October 2 – Everelmus, French hermit
- October 8 – Hugh V, French nobleman
- October 15 – Luka Zhidiata, bishop of Novgorod
- November 14 – Geoffrey II, count of Anjou
- December 2 – Gebhard III, bishop of Regensburg
- December 22 – Cynesige, archbishop of York
- Abbas ibn Shith, king (malik) of the Ghurid dynasty
- Abdallah ibn Al-Aftas, founder of the Aftasid dynasty
- Ahimaaz ben Paltiel, Italian-Jewish liturgical poet (b. 1017)
- Andrew I (the Catholic), king of Hungary
- Chaghri Beg, co-ruler of the Seljuk Empire (b. 989)
- Dharma Pala, ruler of the Pala Dynasty (b. 1035)
- Dominic Loricatus, Italian monk and hermit (b. 995)
- Emund the Old, king of Sweden (approximate date)
- Esico of Ballenstedt, German nobleman (approximate date)
- Igor Yaroslavich, prince of Smolensk (b. 1036)
- Isaac I (Komnenos), Byzantine emperor
- Mei Yaochen, poet of the Song dynasty (b. 1002)
- Otto I (or Odon), count of Savoy (approximate date)
- Pons II (or Pons William), count of Toulouse (b. 991)
- William I, Norman nobleman (approximate date)
