= 1131 =

1131 in various calendars
- Gregorian calendar: 1131; MCXXXI
- Ab urbe condita: 1884
- Armenian calendar: 580; ԹՎ ՇՁ
- Assyrian calendar: 5881
- Balinese saka calendar: 1052–1053
- Bengali calendar: 537–538
- Berber calendar: 2081
- English Regnal year: 31 Hen. 1 – 32 Hen. 1
- Buddhist calendar: 1675
- Burmese calendar: 493
- Byzantine calendar: 6639–6640
- Chinese calendar: 庚戌年 (Metal Dog); 3828 or 3621 — to — 辛亥年 (Metal Pig); 3829 or 3622
- Coptic calendar: 847–848
- Discordian calendar: 2297
- Ethiopian calendar: 1123–1124
- Hebrew calendar: 4891–4892
- Hindu calendars
- Vikram Samvat: 1187–1188
- Shaka Samvat: 1052–1053
- Kali Yuga: 4231–4232
- Holocene calendar: 11131
- Igbo calendar: 131–132
- Iranian calendar: 509–510
- Islamic calendar: 525–526
- Japanese calendar: Daiji 6 / Tenshō 1 (天承元年)
- Javanese calendar: 1036–1038
- Julian calendar: 1131; MCXXXI
- Korean calendar: 3464
- Minguo calendar: 781 before ROC 民前781年
- Nanakshahi calendar: −337
- Seleucid era: 1442/1443 AG
- Thai solar calendar: 1673–1674
- Tibetan calendar: ལྕགས་ཕོ་ཁྱི་ལོ་ (male Iron-Dog); 1257 or 876 or 104 — to — ལྕགས་མོ་ཕག་ལོ་ (female Iron-Boar); 1258 or 877 or 105

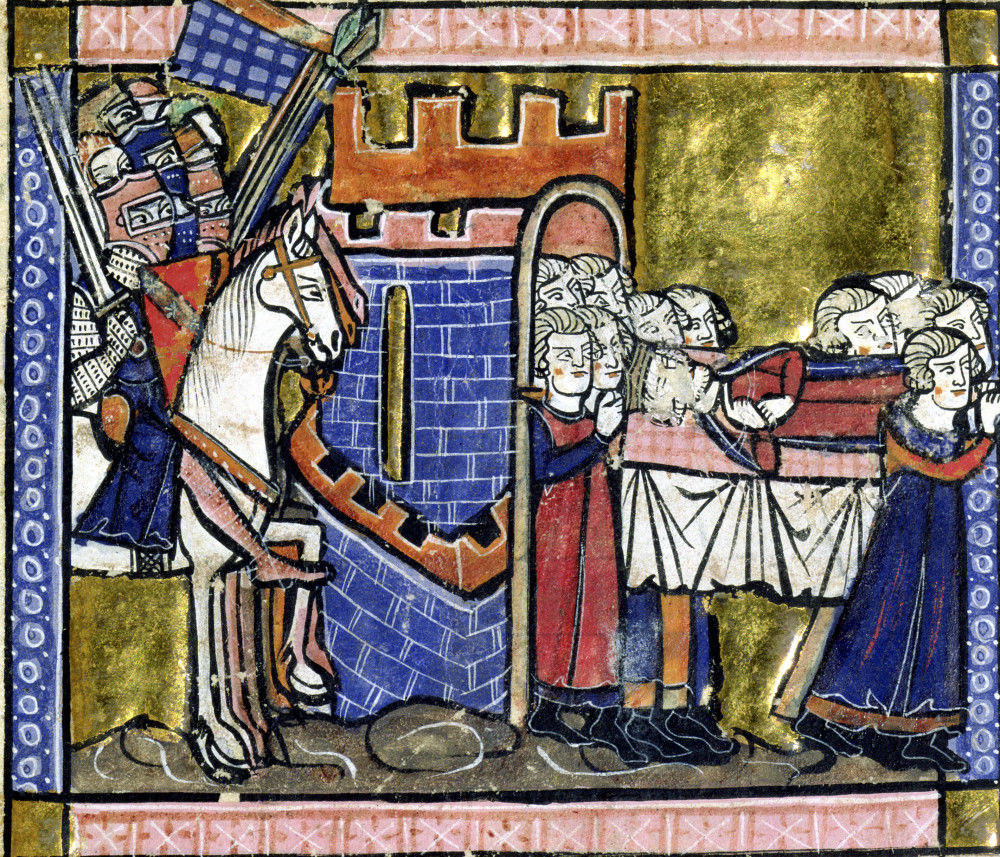
Funeral of King Baldwin II of Jerusalem

Year 1131 (MCXXXI) was a common year starting on Thursday of the Julian calendar.

== Events ==
=== By place ===
==== Levant ====
- August 21 – King Baldwin II falls seriously ill, after his return from Antioch. He is moved to the patriarch's residence near the Holy Sepulchre, where he bequeaths the kingdom to his daughter Melisende, her husband Fulk and their infant son, Baldwin. He takes monastic vows, and dies soon after. Baldwin is buried in the Church of the Holy Sepulchre, at Jerusalem.
- September 14 – Melisende succeeds her father Baldwin II to the throne, and reigns jointly with Fulk, as King and Queen of Jerusalem. Their coronation, in the Church of the Holy Sepulchre, is celebrated with festivities.

==== Europe ====
- Ramon Berenguer III (the Great), count of Barcelona, dies after a 34-year reign. He leaves most of his Catalonian territories to his elder son Ramon Berenguer IV, who continues the fight against the Almoravid Muslims. His younger son Berenguer Ramon inherits Provence (Southern France) and will reign as Ramon I (until 1144).
- The Knights Templars appear in the North-East of Spain and are receiving privileges from King Alfonso I (the Battler). The Templars support him to regain land from the Almoravids. Alfonso grants them exemption of tax on a fifth of the wealth taken from the Muslims. The Templars found their first stronghold in Aragon.
- October 13 – The 15-year-old Philip, eldest son of King Louis VI (the Fat) of France, dies when his horse trips over a black pig that darts out of a dung heap unexpectedly at a market in Paris.

=== By topic ===
==== Religion ====
- May 9 – Tintern Abbey is founded in Wales by Cistercian monks in the Wye Valley.
- Construction begins on the Beisi Pagoda in Jiangsu Province (approximate date).
- The Council of Rheims is held by several French bishops and many clergy.
- Ayn al-Quzat Hamadani,a Persian jurist, mystic, philosopher, poet and mathematician, was accused of heresy by Seljuks and executed, either by crucifixion or burning.

== Births ==
- January 14 – Valdemar I (the Great), king of Denmark (d. 1182)
- November 8 – Myeongjong, Korean king of Goryeo (d. 1202)
- Eudoxia of Kiev, high duchess of Poland (approximate date)
- Henry of Sandomierz, Polish nobleman (approximate date)
- Fujiwara no Teishi, Japanese noblewoman (d. 1176)
- Ladislaus II, king of Hungary and Croatia (d. 1163)
- Nakayama Tadachika, Japanese nobleman (d. 1195)

== Deaths ==
- January 7 – Canute Lavard, duke of Schleswig (b. 1096)
- April 30 – Adjutor, French knight and saint
- August 21 – Baldwin II, king of Jerusalem
- August 30 – Hervey le Breton, English bishop
- October 5 – Frederick I, German archbishop
- October 13 – Philip, co-king of France (b. 1116)
- October 24 – Gerard II, Count of Guelders
- November 16 – Dobrodeia of Kiev, Byzantine princess
- December 4 – Omar Khayyám, Persian astronomer (b. 1048)
- Abu Ali Ahmed ibn al-Afdal, Fatimid vizier
- Alger of Liège, French monk and writer (b. 1055)
- Andronikos Komnenos, Byzantine prince (or 1130)
- Ayn al-Quzat Hamadani, Persian philosopher (b. 1098)
- Elizabeth of Vermandois, English countess
- Feardana Ua Cárthaigh, Irish chief poet
- Gaston IV of Béarn, French nobleman
- Harald Haakonsson, Norse Earl of Orkney
- Joscelin I (Courtenay), count of Edessa
- Mahmud II, sultan of the Seljuk Empire
- Maud (or Matilda), queen of Scotland
- Meng, Chinese empress and regent (b. 1073)
- Ramon Berenguer III, count of Barcelona (b. 1082)
- Stephen II, king of Hungary and Croatia (b. 1101)
- Zheng (or Xiansu), Chinese empress (b. 1079)

== Sources ==
- Fletcher, R. A. (1987). "Reconquest and Crusade in Spain c. 1050–1150". Transactions of the Royal Historical Society. 5. 37: 31–47. doi:10.2307/3679149. JSTOR 3679149.
