= Ramon Berenguer II =

Ramon Berenguer II may refer to:

- Ramon Berenguer II, Count of Barcelona (r. 1076–1082)
- Ramon Berenguer II, Count of Provence (r. 1144–1166)

== See also ==
- Ramon Berenguer III
- Ramon Berenguer IV
