= William Martel =

12th-century English royal steward

William Martel (fl. 1130–1153) was a steward of the royal households of King Henry I and King Stephen of England. He was castellan of Sherborne Castle until 1143.

Martel was of Norman descent. His grandfather and his uncle were sheriffs of Dorset in Norman England. Martel was a steward of Henry I's royal household from at least 1130. He attested to charters in both England and Normandy, which indicates that Martel regularly accompanied the king on both sides of the English Channel.

Martel was in Normandy with Henry's royal court throughout 1134 and 1135. After Henry's death, he was present at King Stephen's coronation in London on 22 December 1135. (Note: Henry I's daughter Matilda was the designated heir to the throne (Crouch, p. 25; Poole, p. 131), but when Henry died in December 1135 his nephew Stephen acted quickly to claim the throne (Davis, p. 16). David Crouch suggested William Martel as a possible informant for Stephen about Henry's serious illness in late November 1135, allowing Stephen time to prepare his speedy actions upon the king's death (Crouch, p. 31–32 and 32n).)

Martel was one of Stephen's most dependable supporters throughout the civil war of 1136–1153, known as The Anarchy. He witnessed 181 charters for Stephen, demonstrating his frequent attendance in the king's entourage, although he received neither an earldom nor any significant estates from Stephen. He was, however, castellan of Sherborne Castle from at least 1141, and may have been castellan from as early as 1139 when the castle was surrendered to Stephen. Between 1141 and 1143, Martel was Stephen's regional military governor in north Dorset and Wiltshire, exercising authority on the king's behalf from Sherborne.

Martel continued to be active on Stephen's behalf after the king was captured at the Battle of Lincoln on 2 February 1141. At the council of Winchester, 7–9 April 1141, Martel was one of a delegation of Stephen's supporters that petitioned for the king's release from prison. The delegation was dismissed and Martel was excommunicated by the Bishop of Winchester. (Note: The Bishop of Winchester was Henry of Blois, King Stephen's younger brother (Crouch, p.36; Davis, p.16). At this council of Winchester, the English Church recognised Matilda's claim to the throne (Crouch, p.173).)

At the Battle of Wilton on 1 July 1143, when Stephen's forces were dispersed by those of Robert, Earl of Gloucester, William Martel led a determined rearguard action that allowed the king to escape. Martel was eventually surrounded and captured, and to secure his release Stephen surrendered Sherborne Castle to Robert of Gloucester. After the loss of Sherborne Castle, Martel continued to be a dominant character at King Stephen's court.

In 1147, the abbot of Abingdon sought ecclesiastical sanctions against Martel for attacks that he carried out against the monastery's estates.

In 1150, a joint meeting of the county courts of Norfolk and Suffolk, at Norwich, was presided over by William Martel as king's justice.

In August 1153, William Martel and other supporters of King Stephen laid waste to the area around Wallingford Castle in an attempt to isolate the army of Henry Plantagenet, who was challenging the king for the throne. (Note: Henry Plantagenet was Matilda's son (Davis, p.104; Crouch, p.134; Poole, p.129).) Martel's forces were ambushed and routed by Henry's army as it attempted to break out from the blockade.

In November 1153, William Martel was one of the 37 witnesses to the Treaty of Westminster which concluded the war between King Stephen and Henry Plantagenet and laid the conditions for Henry's succession.

At Henry's first exchequer, William rendered account for Surrey for 1154–1155 but possibly not very well, for he then lost his position as sheriff.

== Bibliography ==
- Amt, E. (1993). The Accession of Henry II in England. Royal Government Restored. Woodbridge: The Boydell Press. ISBN 0-85115-348-8
- Bartlett, R. (2000). England Under the Norman and Angevin Kings 1075–1225. Oxford: Oxford University Press. ISBN 0-19-822741-8
- Crouch, D. (2000). The Reign of King Stephen 1135–1154. Harlow, Essex: Longman. ISBN 0-582-22657-0
- Davis, R.H.C. (1990).King Stephen, Third Edition. London and New York: Longman. ISBN 0-582-04000-0
- Hollister, C.W. (2003). Henry I, Paperback Edition. New Haven and London: Yale University Press. ISBN 0-300-09829-4
- King, E. (2010). King Stephen. New Haven and London: Yale University Press. ISBN 978-0-300-18195-1(pbk)
- Matthew, D. (2002). King Stephen. London and New York: Hambledon and London. ISBN 1-85285-272-0
- Poole, A.L. (1955). Domesday Book to Magna Carta 1087–1216, Second Edition. Oxford University Press. ISBN 0-19-821707-2
