= Ramon Berenguer IV =

Ramon Berenguer IV (Anglicized Raymond Berengar, Catalan: Ramon Berenguer, Spanish: Ramón Berenguer) was the name of two medieval rulers:

- Ramon Berenguer IV, Count of Barcelona (c. 1114–1162)
- Ramon Berenguer IV, Count of Provence (1198–1245)

== See also ==
- Ramon Berenguer II
- Ramon Berenguer III
