= Ugo Canefri =

Italian Roman Catholic saint

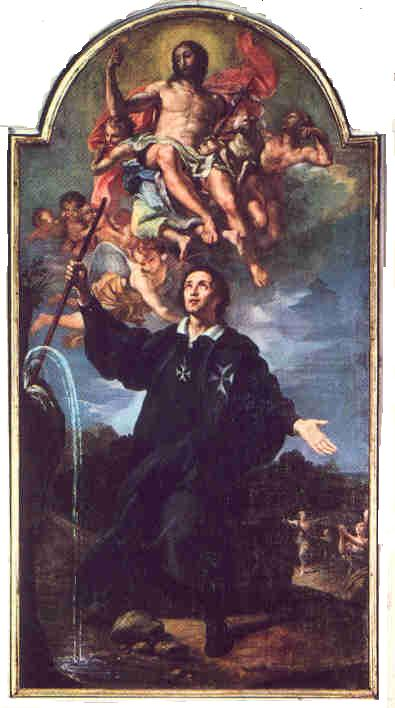
Il miracolo della fonte, painted by Giovanni de Ferrari for the church of S. Giovanni di Prè in Genoa

Ugo Canefri (1148 – 8 October 1233), also known as Ugo da Genova, was an Italian crusader and subsequently a health worker.

Canefri was born, probably in 1148, into the family of the counts of Canefri: feudal lords of Gamondio (today Castellazzo Bormida), Fresonara and Borgo Rovereto in the area of today's Alessandria.

He took part in the Third Crusade together with Conrad of Montferrat and Guala Bicchieri, consul of Vercelli.

In his early twenties, having joined the Knights of Malta, he abandoned his career at arms and was sent to care for the sick in the hospital of the Commenda di San Giovanni di Pré in Genoa. He continued in this work for more than fifty years.

He was beatified soon after his death in 1233, and later canonised as a saint of the Roman Catholic Church. He is venerated particularly in Alessandria and Genoa and within the Order of Malta. His feast day is 8 October.
