= 1162 =

1162 in various calendars
- Gregorian calendar: 1162; MCLXII
- Ab urbe condita: 1915
- Armenian calendar: 611; ԹՎ ՈԺԱ
- Assyrian calendar: 5912
- Balinese saka calendar: 1083–1084
- Bengali calendar: 568–569
- Berber calendar: 2112
- English Regnal year: 8 Hen. 2 – 9 Hen. 2
- Buddhist calendar: 1706
- Burmese calendar: 524
- Byzantine calendar: 6670–6671
- Chinese calendar: 辛巳年 (Metal Snake); 3859 or 3652 — to — 壬午年 (Water Horse); 3860 or 3653
- Coptic calendar: 878–879
- Discordian calendar: 2328
- Ethiopian calendar: 1154–1155
- Hebrew calendar: 4922–4923
- Hindu calendars
- Vikram Samvat: 1218–1219
- Shaka Samvat: 1083–1084
- Kali Yuga: 4262–4263
- Holocene calendar: 11162
- Igbo calendar: 162–163
- Iranian calendar: 540–541
- Islamic calendar: 557–558
- Japanese calendar: Ōhō 2 (応保２年)
- Javanese calendar: 1068–1069
- Julian calendar: 1162; MCLXII
- Korean calendar: 3495
- Minguo calendar: 750 before ROC 民前750年
- Nanakshahi calendar: −306
- Seleucid era: 1473/1474 AG
- Thai solar calendar: 1704–1705
- Tibetan calendar: ལྕགས་མོ་སྦྲུལ་ལོ་ (female Iron-Snake); 1288 or 907 or 135 — to — ཆུ་ཕོ་རྟ་ལོ་ (male Water-Horse); 1289 or 908 or 136

Emperor Xiao Zong (1127–1194)

Year 1162 (MCLXII) was a common year starting on Monday of the Julian calendar.

== Events ==
=== By place ===
==== Europe ====
- March 6 – German forces led by Frederick Barbarossa, Holy Roman Emperor, capture Milan; much of the city is destroyed three weeks later on the emperor's orders. The fortifications are demolished and the churches are destroyed. The population is dispersed, and the commune abolished. The fate of Milan leads to the submission of Brescia, Piacenza, and many other northern Italian cities.
- July 7 – Norwegian forces supporting 6-year-old Magnus V (Erlingsson) defeat the 15-year-old King Haakon II (Sigurdsson), who is killed in battle in Romsdal after a 5-year reign.
- July 15 – Ladislaus II, duke of Bosnia, is declared king of Hungary and Croatia. He is crowned by Archbishop Mikó and grants one-third of the kingdom to his brother, Stephen IV.

==== England ====
- June 3 – King Henry II has his chancellor Thomas Becket elected to succeed the late Theobald of Bec as archbishop of Canterbury. He accepts the pallium sent by Pope Alexander III.

==== Africa ====
- The Almohad emir, Abd al-Mu'min, prepares a gigantic fleet of some four hundred ships to invade Al-Andalus (modern Spain). He dies the following year, before the fleet is completed.
- Egyptian military commander Shawar appointed Vizier of Egypt.

==== China ====
- July 24 – Emperor Gaozong of Song becomes embroiled in war again as hostilities resume with the Jurchen-led Jin dynasty (or "Great Jin") after 21 years of peace. Another peace treaty is signed, Gao abdicates the throne in favor of his adopted son Xiaozong. The smaller Southern Song empire becomes richer than the Song dynasty.

=== By topic ===
==== Religion ====
- The Beisi Pagoda (or North Temple Pagoda) is completed during the Song dynasty in China.

== Births ==
- March 5 – Ogasawara Nagakiyo, Japanese warrior (d. 1242)
- March 11 – Theodoric I, margrave of Meissen (d. 1221)
- June 20 – Benchō, Japanese Buddhist patriarch (d. 1238)
- June 30 – Yang (or Gongsheng), Chinese empress (d. 1233)
- Abd al-Latif al-Baghdadi, Abbasid traveler and writer (d. 1231)
- Fujiwara no Teika, Japanese poet and calligrapher (d. 1241)
- Gebre Mesqel Lalibela, ruler of the Ethiopian Empire (d. 1221)
- Genghis Khan, founder of the Mongol Empire (d. 1227)
- Geoffrey Fitz Peter, 1st Earl of Essex (approximate date)
- Guillem de Cabestany, Spanish troubadour (d. 1212)
- Kajiwara Kagesue, Japanese nobleman (d. 1200)
- Renier of Montferrat, Byzantine politician (d. 1183)

== Deaths ==
- February 18 – Theotonius, Portuguese advisor (b. 1082)
- May 31 – Géza II, king of Hungary and Croatia (b. 1130)
- July 7 – Haakon II (Sigurdsson), king of Norway (b. 1147)
- July 29 – Guigues V, count of Albon and Grenoble (b. 1125)
- July 31 – Fujiwara no Tadazane, Japanese nobleman (b. 1078)
- August 6 – Ramon Berenguer IV, count of Barcelona (b. 1114)
- September 27 – Odo II, duke of Burgundy (b. 1118)
- Adalbert of Pomerania, German missionary and bishop
- Angharad ferch Owain, queen consort of Gwynedd (b. 1065)
- Odo of Deuil (or Eudes), French abbot and historian
- Henry Aristippus (or Henricus), Italian chancellor
- Hugh de Morville, Constable of Scotland, Norman nobleman and knight
- Ibn Zuhr (or Avenzoar), Moorish physician (b. 1094)
- Judith of Baden, German margravine
- Richard de Belmeis II, English bishop and politician
- Sylvester of Marsico, Norman nobleman (b. 1100)
- Tiantong Zongjue, Chinese Buddhist monk (b. 1091)
