= Ramon Berenguer III =

Ramon Berenguer III may refer to:

- Ramon Berenguer III, Count of Barcelona (r. 1086–1131)
- Ramon Berenguer III, Count of Provence (r. 1173–1181)

== See also ==
- Ramon Berenguer II
- Ramon Berenguer IV
