= Battle of Wilton =

1143 battle in England

Coordinates: 51.080°N 1.864°W

- Part of the Anarchy
Date	1 July 1143
Location	Wilton, England
Result	Angevin victory

Belligerents
Blesevins	Angevins

Commanders and leaders
Stephen of Blois; William Martel (POW)	Robert of Gloucester

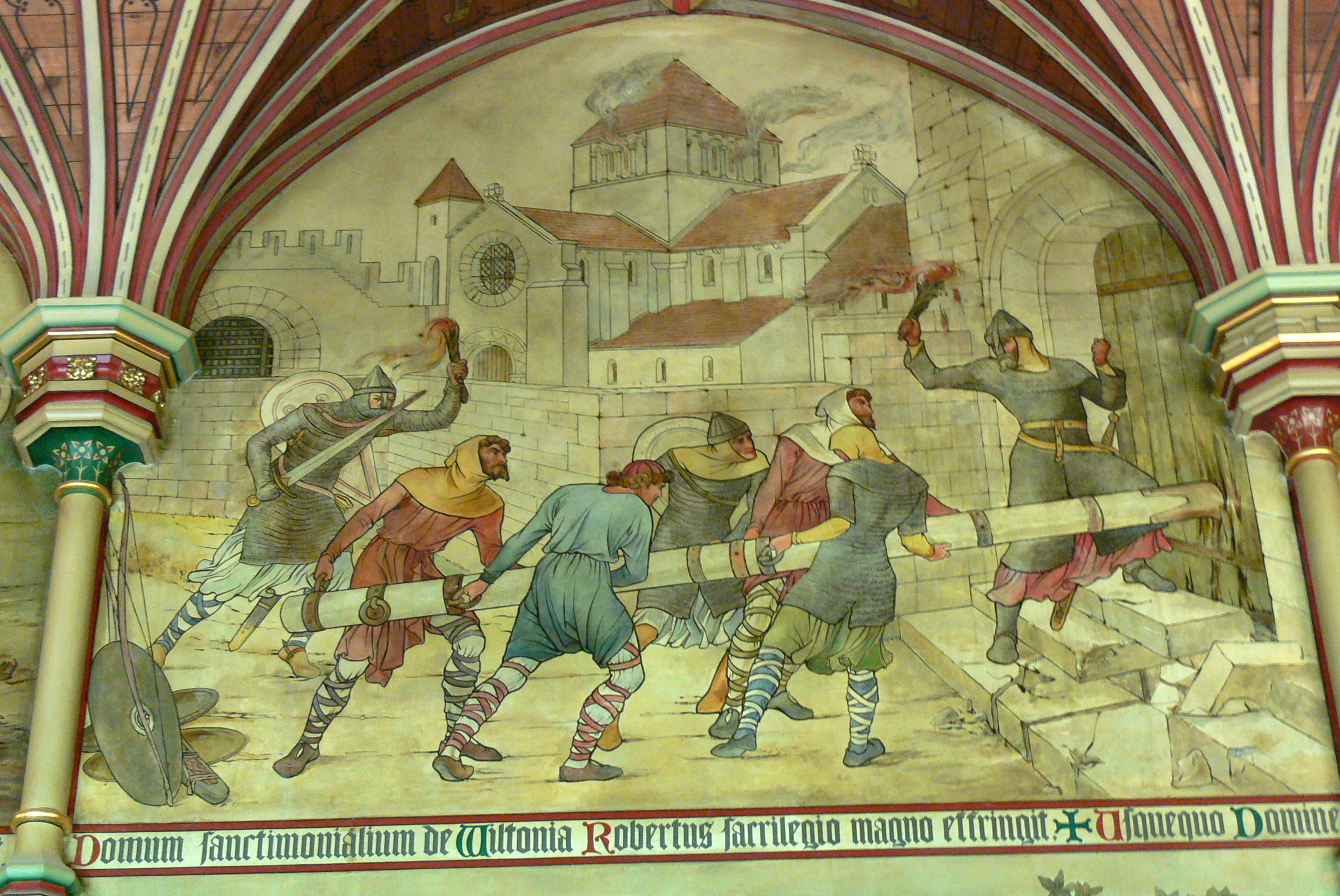
Castle apartments: Banqueting hall - Murals (1875) by Lonsdale showing the siege of Wilton abbey by Robert of Gloucester.

The Battle of Wilton was a battle of the civil war in England known as The Anarchy. It was fought on 1 July 1143 (Note: The date is from Gervase of Canterbury (Davis, p.72n; Crouch, p.207), but Gervase only began writing his chronicle around 1188 (Davis, p.148). The contemporary chronicle Gesta Stephani dates the battle as being after the siege of Oxford Castle (Davis, p.72n), which ended in December 1142 (Davis, p.69; Crouch, p.203; Bradbury, p.123).) at Wilton in Wiltshire. An army under King Stephen was stationed at Wilton Abbey, where it was attacked by an army led by Robert Earl of Gloucester. Although King Stephen's army was defeated, the king himself escaped capture.

== Background ==
On 1 January 1127, King Henry I of England designated his daughter, the Empress Matilda, as heir to the throne. However, when Henry died in 1135, his nephew Stephen of Blois crossed the Channel from Boulogne to England and claimed the throne. He quickly gained the support of London's magnates and the church, and seized control of the treasury at Winchester. He was crowned king on 22 December 1135.

By 1138, Matilda had gathered enough support to challenge Stephen for the throne. Her supporters were led by her half-brother Robert Earl of Gloucester. The ensuing civil war lasted until 6 November 1153 when, by the Treaty of Wallingford, Stephen recognised Matilda's son Henry as heir to the throne.

== Campaign ==
By 1142 both sides had become cautious of risking open battle, and the civil war became a war of sieges as each side attempted to capture strongholds held by the other. With Matilda's strongholds mainly confined to south west England, most of the sieges took place around that area.

In 1143, Stephen embarked on a new campaign to strengthen his position in the west country. He marched on Wareham, the port used by Matilda's party to maintain communications with Normandy. Wareham was too strongly defended for the king to capture, so he turned towards Salisbury instead. On his way there, he occupied Wilton Abbey while waiting for reinforcements from Winchester.

== Battle ==
While King Stephen was stationed at Wilton, mustering his forces for an attack on Salisbury, Earl Robert mounted a surprise attack at sunset on 1 July 1143. Stephen attempted to break out from the siege, but his army was forced back and dispersed by a cavalry charge from Earl Robert's army. In the darkness, Stephen escaped from the burning abbey while his steward William Martel fought a rearguard action to delay the pursuers. After the battle, Earl Robert's forces looted and burned houses in Wilton.

== Aftermath ==
King Stephen surrendered Sherborne Castle to Earl Robert as ransom for the captured William Martel. Sherborne had been an important strategic outpost for the king in the west country. (Note: R.H.C. Davis suggested that Stephen was prepared to pay such a heavy ransom because he was keen to avoid his father's reputation for deserting his friends (Davis, p.73).) As a result of its surrender, Earl Robert's power extended from the Bristol Channel to the south coast of Dorset. The civil war settled into a stalemate, with Stephen unable to extend his power into the west country, while Matilda was unable to extend hers beyond that region.

== Bibliography ==
- Barlow, F. (1999). The Feudal Kingdom of England 1042-1216, Fifth Edition. Harlow, Essex: Longman. ISBN 0-582-38117-7
- Bradbury, J. (1996). Stephen and Matilda: The Civil War of 1139-1153. Stroud, Gloucs: Alan Sutton. ISBN 0-7509-0612-X
- Crouch, D. (2000). The Reign of King Stephen 1135-1154. Harlow, Essex: Longman. ISBN 0-582-22657-0
- Davis, R.H.C. (1990).King Stephen, Third Edition. London and New York: Longman. ISBN 0-582-04000-0
- Matthew, D. (2002). King Stephen. London and New York: Hambledon and London. ISBN 1-85285-272-0
- Poole, A.L. (1955). Domesday Book to Magna Carta 1087-1216, Second Edition. Oxford University Press. ISBN 0-19-821707-2
