= Divina dispensatione =

Papal bulls issued by Eugene III

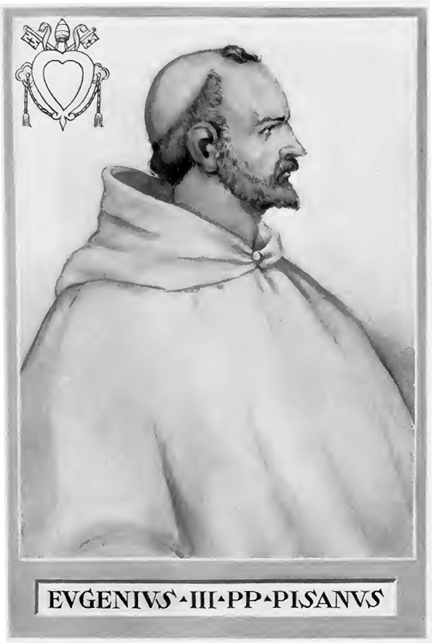
Pope Eugene III

Divina dispensatione is the name for two papal bulls issued by Pope Eugene III. The first was issued on 5 October 1146 to the clergy of Italy, urging Italians to join the Second Crusade. The second was issued on 11 April 1147 at Troyes and called for the Wendish Crusade against the pagan Slavs. In the second bull Eugene declared:

Certain of you, however, (are) desirous of participating in so holy a work and reward and plan to go against the Slavs and other pagans living towards the North and to subject them, with the Lord's assistance, to the Christian religion. We give heed to the devotion of these men, and to all those who have not accepted the cross for going to Jerusalem and who have decided to go against the Slavs and to remain in the spirit of devotion on that expedition, as it is prescribed, we grant that same remission of sin...and the same temporal privileges as to the crusaders to Jerusalem.
