= Jetsun Dragpa Gyaltsen =

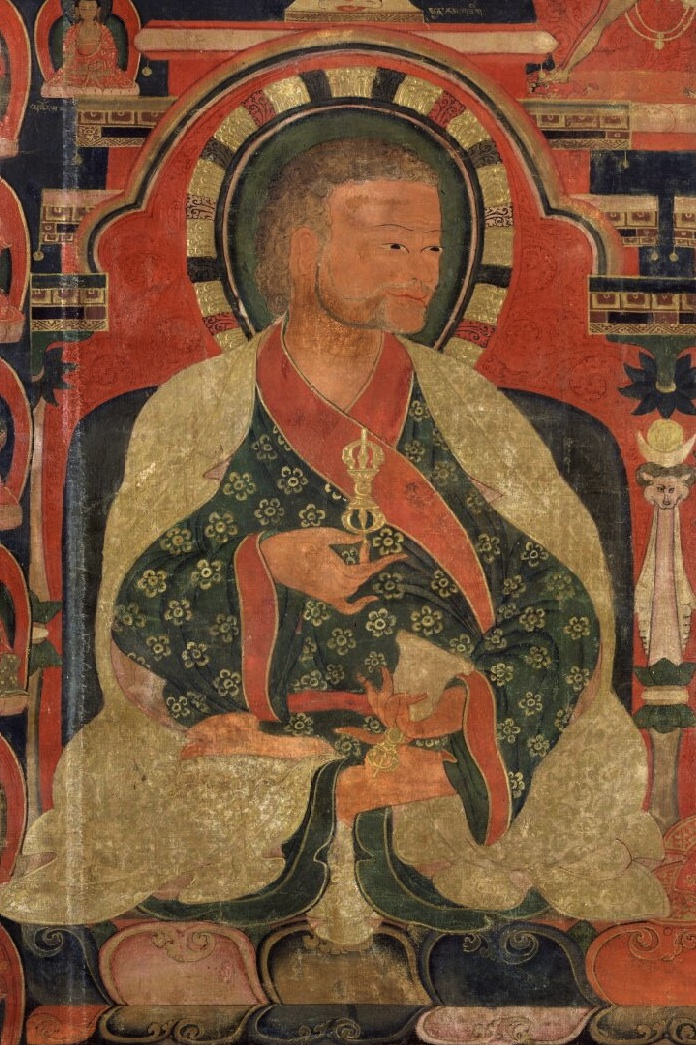
Drakpa Gyaltsen (1147 - 1216)

Jetsun Dragpa Gyaltsen (Tibetan: རྗེ་བཙུན་གྲགས་པ་རྒྱལ་མཚན, Wylie: rje btsun grags pa rgyal mtshan) (1147–1216) was a Tibetan spiritual leader and the third of the Five Sakya Patriarchs (sa skya gong ma rnam lnga) of Tibet. He was also the guru of the famous Sakya Pandita.

== See also ==
- Simhamukha
