= Cadfan ap Cadwaladr =

Son of Cadwaladr ap Gruffydd

Cadfan ap Cadwaladr, Lord of Ceredigion (c. 1140 - c. 1215) was the elder son of Cadwaladr ap Gruffydd, the brother of Owain Gwynedd, King of Gwynedd and overlord of all Wales. His mother was his father's first wife, Gwerfel ferch Gwrgan. He was probably born in Ceredigion, where his father held extensive estates. His father was banished in 1144. He should not be confused with Cadell ap Gruffydd, King of Deheubarth, who took Ceredigion from Hywel ab Owain Gwynedd, son of Owain Gwynedd, in 1150. Cadfan probably spent the rest of his life in exile in England. He married Gwenllian, a daughter of Owain Cyfeiliog. He is known to have had only one daughter: Tangwystl ferch Cadfan (born c. 1212).
