= Lhachen Naglug =

Lhachen Naglug (Lha-chen-Nag-lug) (c. 1110 -1140) was a ruler of Ladakh. He is mentioned in the Ladakhi Chronicles. During his reign, buildings such as the palace at Wanla Palace and the Khala Tse Castle were built.
