= Fannu =

Fannu Bint Umar ibn Yintan
- Princess of Almoravid Dynasty
- Died: 1147
- Dynasty: Almoravid
- Father: Umar ibn Yintan
- Occupation: Military Commander

Fannu bint Umar ibn Yintan (died April 1147) was a princess and a Commanding officer of the Almoravid dynasty. In the guise of a man, wearing armour she participated in the defense of the citadel of Marrakesh during the Almohad conquest of the city in 1147.

== Life ==
She was raised in the Almoravid Palace in Marrakesh (in present-day Morocco) as the daughter of Umar ibn Yintan. Her future role was not strange, as women during the Almoravid rule had a higher status than what was otherwise normal in Muslim states. Women at court were known to wield great influence in state affairs in the tradition and example of Zaynab an-Nafzawiyyah, co-founder of the dynasty: women did not wear veils, and the education of women was accepted and normal, with notable women such as Hafsa Bint al-Hajj al-Rukuniyya holding courses for the women of the palace and at least two women known to have been doctors.

In March 1147, the forces of the caliph Abd-al Mumin, reached the capital of Marrakech during his jihad against the Almoravids, broke into the town, and battled over the control of the qasba (fortress) of the Almoravid Palace for days. Fannu famously dressed herself in male clothing and participated in the defense of the fortress, and according to tradition, the Almohads did not manage to conquer the fortress before "a young Almoravid woman, dressed as a man", was killed. The Almohads were reportedly astonished by Fannu's conduct and bravery during the battle and surprised that they had not realized that she was a woman before she died.
