= Philopatium =

Former palace in Constantinople

Coordinates: 41.030°N 28.920°E

Philopatium or Philopation (Greek: Φιλοπάτιον) was the name of a palace and region outside the walls of the Byzantine capital Constantinople (modern Istanbul, Turkey), known for its parks and gardens.

According to 11th-century accounts, it was located north of Constantinople, just outside the Blachernae walls. Competing accounts place it seaward of the Golden Gate.

== Residence of Justinian I and Theodora ==
The place was loved by Justinian and Theodora, and served as a spring or summer retreat for the Byzantine emperors after them. The 6th-century historian Procopius describes it as "A luxuriant forest of cypresses, verdant and flowery slopes, a spring noiselessly pouring forth its calm and refreshing waters, these are the features which beseem that sacred spot."

Near the centre of the plain is the spring called the Life-giving Spring (Ζωοδόχος Πηγή, Zoodochos Pege). When it was reported that a blind man had been restored to sight at the touch of its waters, Leo I erected a church over the spring. Justinian, believing that a bath in the spring had cured him of calculus, thriftily enlarged the church by means of the superfluous material that remained after the completion of Hagia Sophia. Twice destroyed by earthquake, it was successively rebuilt by Irene of Athens, wife of Leo IV, in the 8th century, and by Basil I one hundred years later.

== Burning and restoration ==
The Bulgarian Tsar Simeon, during one of his raids in the early 10th century, burnt it to the ground, and on his departure it was restored by Romanos I Lekapenos. A generation later King Peter, the son of Simeon, wedded at its altar the granddaughter of that same Romanos. There too was solemnized the wedding of the youthful Emperor John V, and Helena, the daughter of John VI Kantakouzenos.

== Second Crusade ==
Near the church was the Palace of the Pege, or of the Spring, to which the emperors annually removed on Ascension Day, and where they devoted a few weeks to their health. During the Second Crusade, King Louis VII of France and his wife, Queen Eleanor of Aquitaine, were for several weeks lodged there.

== House arrest of Maria of Antioch ==
In 1182 Andronikos Komnenos put Empress Dowager Maria of Antioch under house arrest in the palace, before her imprisonment in a dungeon and execution.

== Headquarters of Murad II ==
Not a vestige of the palace exists. Here were the headquarters of Ottoman Sultan Murad II during his unsuccessful three months' siege of Constantinople in 1422. The church was greatly injured at the time, but not entirely destroyed until after the victory of Mehmed II.

== Fate of the church ==
The site of the church (nowadays the suburb of Balıklı) remained in Greek Orthodox hands throughout the Ottoman period, becoming the site of a patriarchal hospital in the 18th century. The church was destroyed again by Janissaries in 1825, and rebuilt in 1833. The cemetery of the church serves as the principal Orthodox cemetery of the city, housing the tombs of many patriarchs.
