= Gaucherius =

Saint Gaucherius
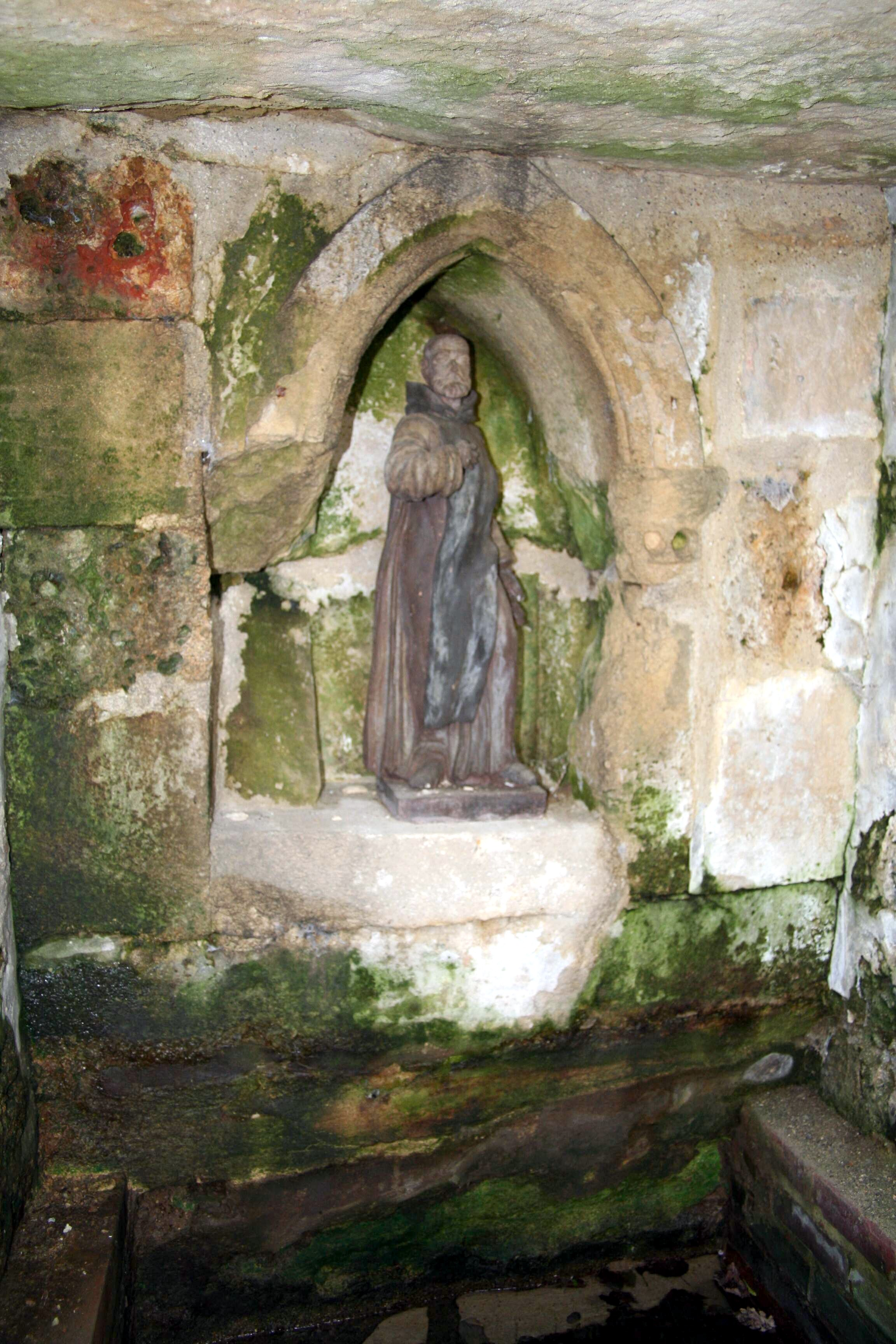
- Born: 1060; Meulan-sur-Seine, France
- Died: 1140
- Venerated in: Roman Catholic Church
- Canonized: 1194 by Pope Clement III
- Feast: 9 April

Gaucherius (1060 - 1140), a Christian saint, was born at Meulan-sur-Seine, France.

== Biography ==
He received a classical education and became a priest. He felt a deep longing for solitude. After spending a night in prayer at the tomb of Leonard of Limoges, Gaucherius went into the wild forest region and constructed a hermitage He thereupon devoted his life God as a hermit and began with his friend, Germond, to reside in the area of Limoges. Their example attracted others who built hermitages near to theirs. Finally Gaucherius decided to build a monastery at Aureil and to establish two communities, one for men, the other for women, both under the rule of St. Augustine.

The passage of an eremitical settlement into the canonical life was one of the principal ways through which the Canons Regular grew in the 11th and 12th Century. The community of Aureil is typical of these kinds of Ordo Novus Canons Regular. Thereafter he lived with his companions, being for all a model of sanctity. His companions and disciples include Lambert of Angoulême and Faucherus as well as the founder of Grandmont monastery, Stephen Muret.

He died from a fall from a horse in 1140 at the age of eighty. He was canonized in 1194. His feast day is April 9.
