= Raymond the Palmer =

Raymond of Piacenza (1139/40 – 26 July 1200), called the Palmer or Zanfogni, was a Catholic pilgrim and religious who practiced charity to the poor and ill. Raymond's nickname, "the Palmer", derives from his pilgrimage to Jerusalem, from which he brought back the customary palm frond. Such a pilgrim was called a Palmarius or Palmerius (Italian: Palmario or Palmerio). His feast day is 26 July.

Raymond's life is known from a Latin vita written in 1212, only twelve years after his death, by a certain Rufinus, at the instigation of Raymond's son Gerard. This was kept in the library of San Raimondo di Piacenza, a Cistercian convent, until 1525, when it was lent out to a Dominican friar to be translated into Italian. It was never seen again. The Bollandist Peter van der Bosch translated the Italian back into Latin for the Acta Sanctorum (July, vol. VI, col. 645–57). This version has been translated into English by Kenneth Baxter Wolf.

== Childhood and married life ==
Raymond was born at Piacenza to parents "neither illustrious in origin nor completely lowborn", i.e., of the burgeoning middle class. He was raised by his mother until about the age of twelve, and never received a thorough education, being still "unlettered" at his death. At about twelve he was sent by his father to learn the family trade of shoemaking at a certain workshop. His father died when he was an adolescent (his biographer presumes that to be fourteen), and after receiving the permission of Bishop Hugh (1155–66), Raymond and his mother went on a pilgrimage to Jerusalem. Raymond was ill for much of the journey and almost died on the return trip by sea.

Raymond's mother died soon after their return to Italy but before they reached Piacenza. At Piacenza Raymond's relatives persuaded him to marry, which he did, and he returned to shoemaking to support his family. In his leisure hours, his biographer writes, he conversed with religious men and became wise enough to preach, on holidays, in houses and workshops. His fame soon grew and people flocked to hear him. His biographer refers to him as their "spiritual leader", though he notes that Raymond refused to contravene canon law by preaching publicly. Instead, he urged those of his listeners who wanted more to speak with a priest or a monk.

In the space of one year all five of Raymond's children died, probably of an epidemic. He tried to persuade his wife to abstain from sexual relations so that they could devote themselves more fully to God, but she refused, saying "If I wished to be a nun, I would follow this advice. But since you have married me, it seems right to me to behave like a married woman, not like a widow or a nun". They had another child, a son named Gerard (Gerardo), whom Raymond secretly dedicated to Brigid of Kildare in her church at Piacenza. Shortly after his wife was afflicted with an incurable disease, to which she eventually succumbed, a fact which is treated by his biographer as Providence. Raymond then took vow a celibacy and, leaving Gerard and all his possessions (including his house) with his parents-in-law, left on a series of pilgrimages, which he planned to perform for the rest of his life.

== Pilgrimages ==
Raymond first followed the Way of Saint James to Santiago de Compostela, supporting himself by begging. From Compostela he went to Vézelay, where, since the mid-eleventh century, the body of Mary Magdalene was said to lie. According to a legend that developed there Mary had lived out her life in penance in the caves of the Sainte-Baume near Marseille after the ascension of Christ. Raymond visited there and then hurried through Provence, where he visited the shrine of the Three Maries at Saintes-Maries-de-la-Mer in the Camargue. From there he visited the shrine of Anthony the Great at Vienne and that of Bernard of Clairvaux, either at Clairvaux or Menthon. He returned to Italy and visited the shrine of Augustine of Hippo at Pavia. He then proceeded to Rome.

While he was sleeping under a portico at the Basilica of Saint Peter, contemplating another pilgrimage to Jerusalem, he had a vision of Jesus Christ, who told him to return to Piacenza and "lead the rich to almsgiving, rival parties to peace, and those who have strayed—especially wayward women—to a proper way of life". He claimed that Christ had told him to wear a sky-blue, knee-length garment with loose sleeves and no hood, and to always carry a cross over his shoulder. These things he adopted in the Val di Taro, on his way back to Piacenza. He also wore a traveller's cap, perhaps as a reminder of his former pilgrim's life.

If I were to try to describe one by one all of blessed Raymond’s virtues, all of his labors, and each of his pious works, an entire year would not be sufficient for the task. So I think it will suffice to have briefly culled a few from them, for the glory of God and his saint and as an example to those living now as well as to those who will come in the future. So I will not mention how many times he came upon children here and there who had been abandoned and secretly cast aside; children whom he carried—often two at a time, one in each arm, lest they perish in their misery, all the while crying out of pity—back to his hospital to nurture with his care. Nor will I say how many sick people, especially foreigners and pilgrims, destitute and on the street without any resources, he carried on his own back.

—Master Rufino (Rufinus magister), Raymond's biographer

== Spiritual leadership at Piacenza ==
At Piacenza Raymond, then thirty-eight years of age, received the support of Bishop Theobald (1167–92) and the canonry of the Twelve Apostles gave him a large building next to theirs, where he established a xenodochium (1178). He set about gathering those who were to ashamed or to infirm to beg, and went through the streets calling out for alms from the rich. He soon attracted a large number of beggars and religiously motivated persons who helped him in his task. He established a domicile attached to the canonry for women, "which was somewhat better furnished and yet more closed off" than the original building, where he housed the men in need of shelter. He also began a ministry to prostitutes, some of whom were convinced to marry and some to become nuns, while some continued in their prostitution.

Raymond also acted as advocate of the poor before the civic tribunal, which, Rufinus boasts, "often deferred to his judgment with regard to what ought be done". He tried to stem in Piacenza the factionalism and party strife that was endemic in the cities of northern Italy, but in this he was largely unsuccessful. He eventually prophesied destruction for Piacenza: "Woe to you, seditious Piacenza! God has already prepared a scourge with which to beat you. You will be plundered and set on fire. You will lose your fortunes and your lives." Rufinus wrote that this prophecy had been fulfilled since Raymond's death, but no fire and plundering is known from any other records. Raymond tried to intervene to prevent a war between Piacenza and Cremona, but the Cremonese imprisoned him. He was eventually released because of his sanctity.

Raymond was also an opponent of knightly hastiludes (his biographer calls them "Trojan games ... [a] kind of gladiatorial contest [for "mounted men"] in which brawling, injury, and murder were commonplace"), which he sought to outlaw. He reputedly dragged the bishop and the city magistrate (or prefect) to these events to put a stop to them, since he himself could not convince the youths to stop. Influenced by his own spell in jail, he also began visiting prisons, and spoke on behalf of many prisoners whom he had converted, some of whom later went on to join the canonry of the Twelve Apostles.

Raymond's institutions also took in abandoned children, whom he is said to have gathered up himself. Raymond had a "keen sense of the social realities of poverty and marginality" and he once led a demonstration of beggars through the streets crying out for help from the rich. He was on good terms with the bishops of Piacenza throughout his life, though this did not prevent his criticising their inaction against factionalism.

== Death and subsequent miracles ==
Raymond died of a fever on 26 July 1200 at the age of sixty. He had called his son to his bedside, where he convinced him to take up the religious life. His body quickly drew throngs of visitors, and Bishop Grimerio buried him in the canonry, where his tomb attracted suppliants even from Cremona. The city established a Hospital of Saint Raymond (Hospitale sancti Raymundi) with the gifts made in his name. The aforementioned Cistercian convent of San Raimondo in Piacenza was also named after Raymond. His veneration was approved by a papal bull of Martin V in 1422.

Between 1208 and 1247 many miracles were reportedly wrought through Raymond's intercession throughout Lombardy. Rufinus records how a German living in the Piedmont, Ogerius by name, accidentally swallowed a bone during a Christmas meal, which lodged in his chest and caused him great pain. Informed by a friend returning from Piacenza of Raymond's tomb there, he vowed to visit it if he should be cured. Immediately he regurgitated the bone and brought it to Raymond's tomb, to be hung up there as a memorial of the miracle. In the county of Lavagna in the diocese of Genoa a certain girl who was possessed by a demon taunted the exorcists with "Raymond expels [demons] easily", explaining to her parents, Sophia and Hugo, that Raymond was "a new saint among the people of Piacenza". Her parents brought her to his tomb and the demon was expelled. News of this spread throughout Lavagna until it reached a certain nobleman, Bernard de la Torre, and his wife Gelasia, who had a paralysed daughter named Mabilina. Gelasia prayed that if God would heal Mabilina she would send a wax statuette to adorn Raymond's tomb. Five days later Mabilina was walking; Gelasia fulfilled her vow.

Rufinus also tells of a locally famous Pavian woman, Berta, who was possessed and tormented by three demons named Tralinus, Capricius, and Carincius. Many tried to exorcise them by singing the so-called "Verses of Saint Maurice" to her, and her sister led her from church to church. Eventually she was brought to the tomb of Raymond, where she was almost instantaneously healed. Rufinus also describes how a man named, ironically, Gerald Vitalis from Ripa in the county of Piacenza, suffered from "a hernia such that the intestines, sunken into his abdominal cavity, swelled to the point that he was unable to walk or engage in any kind of work". He was unconvinced, despite the entreaties of his wife, that Raymond was a saint, but he eventually agreed to accompany her to his tomb, where he was, over the course of a few days, healed. In thanks "he donated two measures of wine every year to the poor of Raymond's hospital, so that from that time on the caretakers of this same institution, accustomed to going about asking for donations of wine, could henceforth depend on a more stable supply."

Rufinus also describes a Venetian woman named Maria, a hunchback (though Rufinus avoids this term) so bent over that "you might even say that she was a quadruped". After completing the laborious journey to Raymond's tomb and praying there, she was healed and could walk upright without a cane. At about the same time there was in Acquense (the area around Acqui Terme) a man named Lomellus, who "had to bind his bowels with an iron belt", and his wife, who had "been confined to bed for an entire year". Lomellus promised God that if he were healed he would make a pilgrimage to Raymond's tomb. His belt promptly fell off and broke into pieces. His wife, who saw it, swore that she would accompany him and immediately she too was healed.
