= Baldwin of Rieti =

Italian Roman Catholic saint

Saint Baldwin
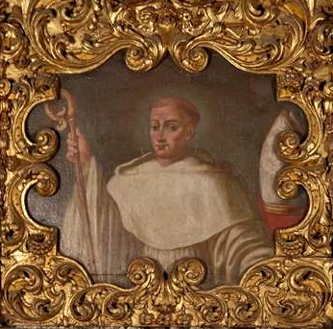
- 18th-century depiction of St. Baldwin in the choir-stalls of the Monastery of São João de Tarouca, Tarouca, Portugal
- Died: 1140; Rieti, Italy
- Feast: 24 July
- Patronage: Rieti, Italy

Baldwin was a Benedictine abbot and a follower of St. Bernard of Clairvaux. Baldwin, an Italian by birth, entered the Clairvaux Monastery in France. Later in life Baldwin was assigned to Italy as abbot of San Pastore, near Rieti. There he remained until his death in 1140. He is patron saint of Rieti.
