= Aibert =

Saint Aibert of Crespin OSB
- Born: 1060; Espein, Diocese of Tournai
- Died: April 7, 1140 (aged 80); Tournai
- Venerated in: Catholic Church
- Feast: April 7

Aibert (or Aybert) of Crespin, (also Aibert of Tournai) was a Benedictine monastic and hermit revered for his intense life of prayer, asceticism and devotion to Mary. His biography was written by a contemporary, Robert, Archdeacon of Oostrevand.

== Life ==
Aibert was born in 1060 in the village of Espain in the Diocese of Tournai, in present-day Belgium. His father was a knight, Aldbald of Espen, near Tournai. Aibert fasted frequently, eating only bread or an apple when working in the fields.

Moved by a wandering minstrel singing a lament about Theobald of Provins, Aibert began to live a life of asceticism under the direction of a hermit named John who lived in a wood near Crespin Abbey. While Aibert and John shared a single cell, they survived primarily on uncooked herbs and, occasionally, bread. "They chose to eat neither foods of animal origins, nor foods that had been cooked."

Aibert joined the abbot on a pilgrimage to Rome, and upon his return in 1090, entered the monastery, becoming a Benedictine. He spent twenty-five years at Crespin Abbey, being selected as provost and cellarer. Aibert was known for his veneration of the Blessed Virgin Mary and is reported to have said 150 Hail Marys daily, 100 with genuflexions and 50 with prostrations. (At that time, the Hail Mary consisted of: "Hail Mary, full of grace, the Lord is with thee; blessed art thou amongst women, and blessed is the fruit of thy womb.")

In 1115, Aibert was allowed to return to the solitary life of a hermit. Aibert built a hermitage in the wilderness and was sought out by those seeking spiritual advice and healing. Sometime after returning to the wilderness, Aibert was ordained to the priesthood by Bishop Burchard of Cambrai. Aibert is noted to have said two Masses each day, one for the living and one for the dead.

He died in 1140 at the age of 80. His feast day is April 7.
