= Nicholas of Amiens =

Nicholas of Amiens (Nicholaus Ambianensis) (1147 – c.1200) was a French theologian, a pupil of Gilbert de la Porrée.

He is known for a single major work, the De arte catholicae fidei; it is modelled after Euclid's Elements. Some still attribute it to Alain of Lille, a question that has divided scholars since the nineteenth century.
