= Pedro Martins, Lord of the Tower of Vasconcelos =

Pedro Martins
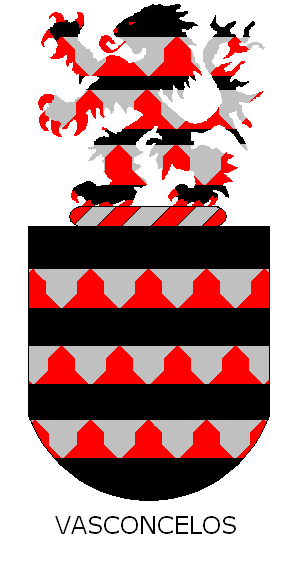
- The Vasconcelos coat of arms
- Born: c. 1160; Kingdom of Portugal
- Occupation: Knight
- Title: Lord of the Tower of Vasconcelos
- Spouse: Teresa Soares da Silva
- Children: João Peres de Vasconcelos, Sancha Peres de Vasconcelos
- Parents: Martim Moniz (father); Teresa Afonso (mother)

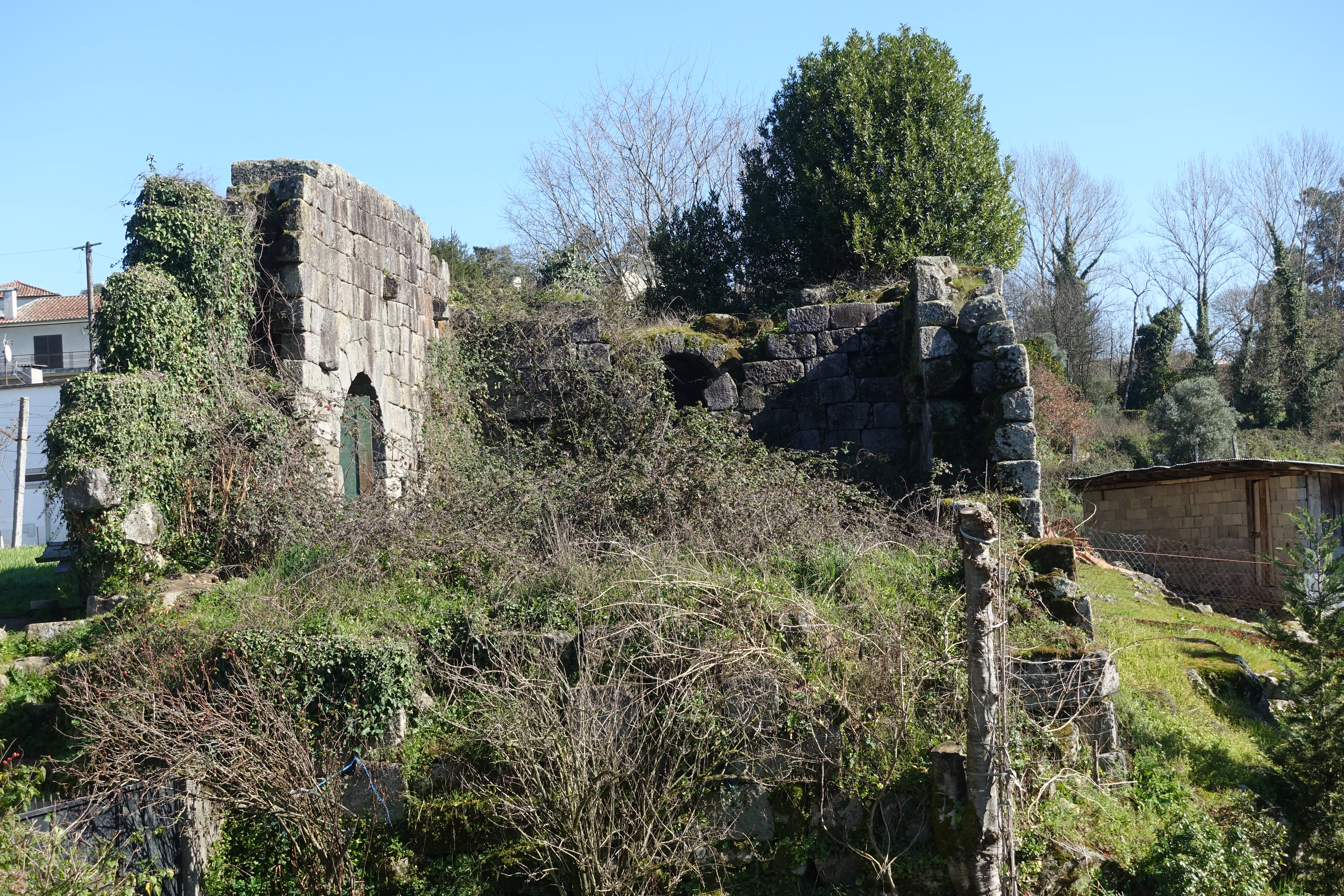
Ruins of Tower of Vasconcelos

Pedro Martins, Lord of the Tower of Vasconcelos, was a Portuguese 12th-century noble knight, son of Martim Moniz (legendary figure of the Siege of Lisbon in 1147) and Teresa Afonso.

He was the Lord of the Tower of Vasconcelos, located in the parish of Santa Maria de Ferreiros (municipality of Amares), in the north of Portugal, in the modern district of Braga. The said tower, seat of the preeminent family of the Vasconcelos, had previously belonged to the Order of the Knights Templar.

Pedro Martins married Teresa Soares da Silva, and had a son and a daughter:

- João Peres de Vasconcelos, "O Tenreiro", the first to use the surname Vasconcelos and the one to give it continuity, married to Maria Soares Coelho.
- Sancha Peres de Vasconcelos, married first to Mendo Afonso, and secondly to João Gomes Barreto.
