= Martim Moniz =

Portuguese knight (died 1147)

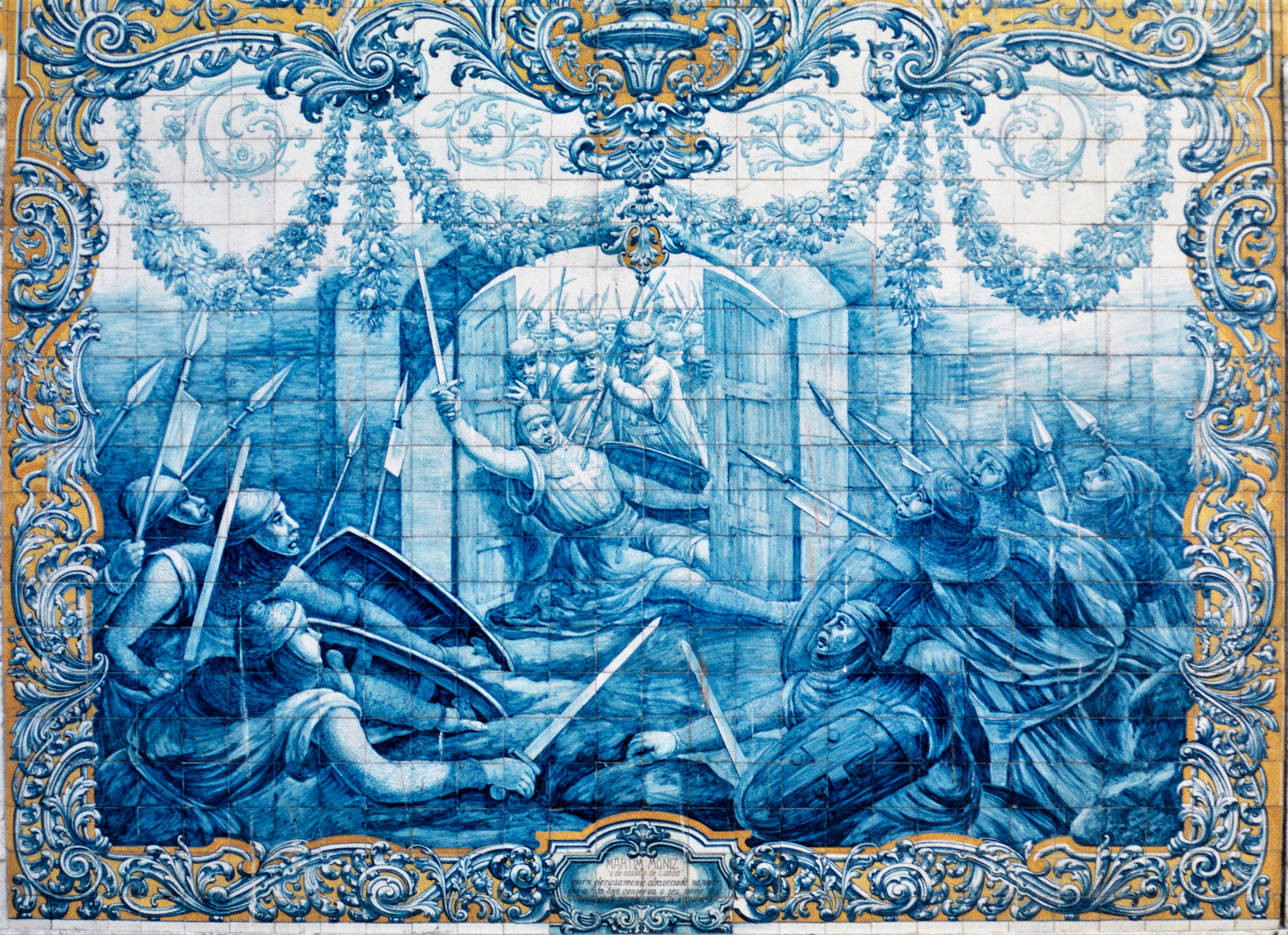
- "Martim Moniz, in the Castle of Lisbon, dies in glory by lodging his own body in the gateway that still bears his name today", by Pereira Cão
- Born: Kingdom of Portugal
- Died: 1147; Lisbon
- Occupation: Knight
- Spouse: Teresa Afonso
- Children: Pedro Martins da Torre, João Martins de Cabreira Salsa, Martim Martins de Cabreira
- Parent(s): Maria Nunes de Grijó, D. Monio Osorez de Cabreira

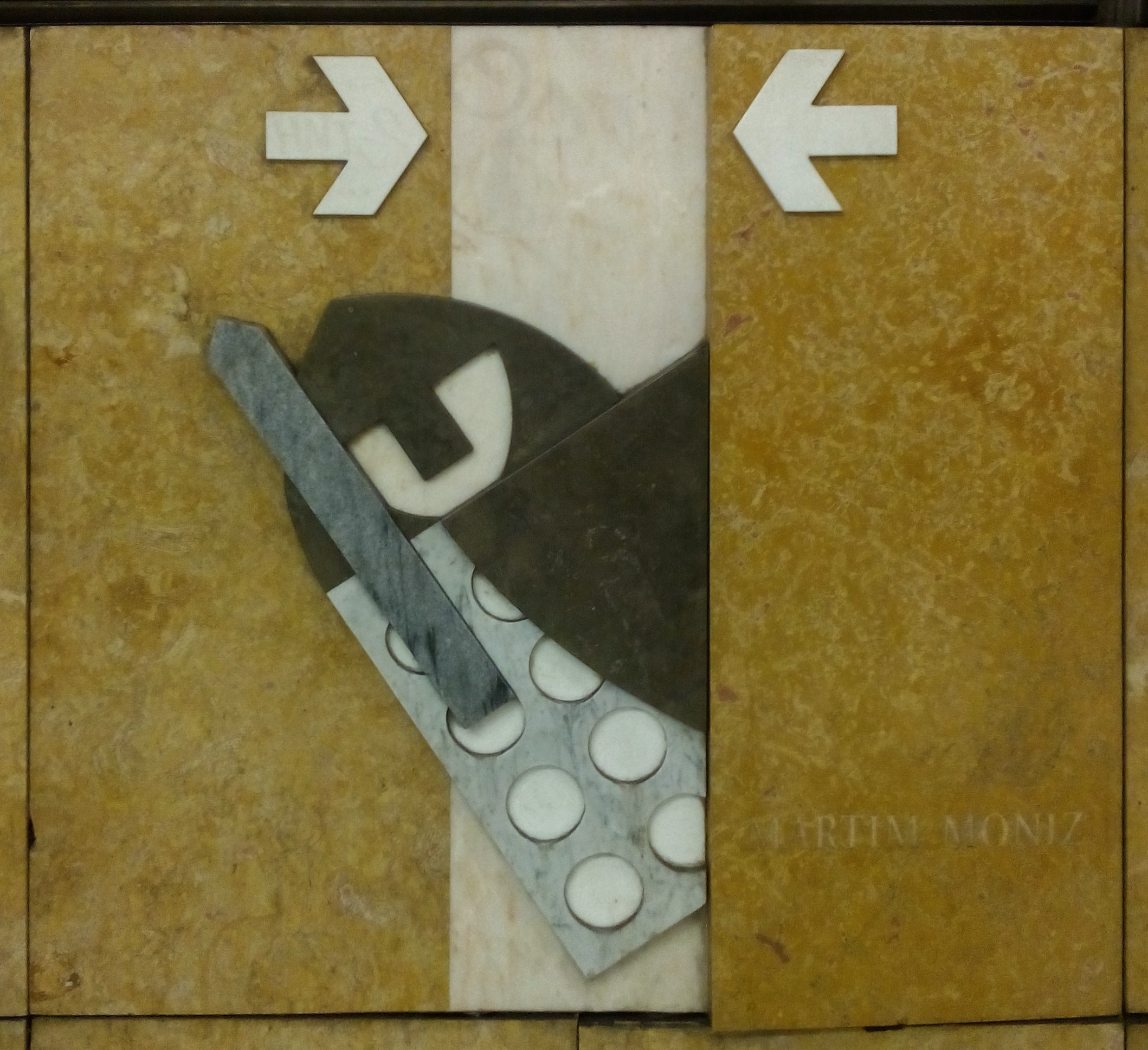
Stylized depiction of Martim Moniz in the Martim Moniz Metro Station

Martim Moniz (Portuguese pronunciation: [mɐɾˈtĩ muˈniʃ]; died 1147) was a Portuguese knight of noble birth, and famous figure in the Siege of Lisbon in 1147.

== Legend ==
According to legend, Martim Moniz was a knight participating in the Christian reconquest force, led by king Afonso I of Portugal, in the Siege of Lisbon, during the Reconquista. Nobleman and captain of the army of Afonso I of Portugal, author of notable feats in the Battle of Ourique, at one point in the siege of São Jorge Castle, he saw the Moors closing the castle doors. He led an attack on the doors, and sacrificed himself by lodging his own body in the doorway, preventing the defenders from fully closing the door.

This act allowed time for his fellow soldiers to arrive and secure the door, leading to the eventual capture of the castle. Martim Moniz was killed in the incident. In his honor, the entrance was dubbed Porta de Martim Moniz (Gate of Martim Moniz).

== Historical details ==
The only two contemporary testimonies of the conquest of Lisbon from the Moors are the letters of the crusaders Osbern ("De expugnatione Lyxbonensi") and Arnulf, who, in their narratives, do not mention either this character or this episode.

Historiographically, Alexandre Herculano considered the episode narrated by tradition to be legendary, although it seems plausible in the context at the time. After this criticism, Vieira da Silva argued for the veracity of the episode. Alfredo Pimenta, in his 1940 work A façanha de Martim Moniz, comments on the existence of a document dated from 1258 mentioning to the Gate of Martim Moniz. The Nobiliário of Pedro Afonso, Count of Barcelos only mentions that it was said that Martim Moniz had died at that gate. But this name may come from an event other than the reconquest of Lisbon, namely the Civil War of 1245-1247. Pedro Gomes Barbosa made the most recent critical synthesis of this subject, considering that the episode lacks tactical meaning since there was not really an assault on Lisbon, as the city surrendered.

Although there are controversies in genealogical research, some authors believe that this person was in fact the son of Monio Osorez de Cabreira and Maria Nunes de Grijó, married to Teresa Afonso (who some genealogists point out as an illegitimate daughter of D. Afonso Henriques and Elvira Gualter), with whom he had three children:

1. Pedro Martins da Torre, ( 1160-1???), lord of the Torre de Vasconcelos (from which the important Vasconcelos lineage comes), married to Teresa Soares da Silva, daughter of the lord of Torre de Silva, Soeiro Pires da Silva;
2. João Martins de Cabreira Salsa (1???-1???);
3. Martim Martins de Cabreira (1???-12??) ( Archdeacon of the See of Braga ), who left a will after 1256, in which he named his great-nephew, Estêvão Anes de Vasconcelos, as heir.

Genealogists point to another character with the name of Martim Moniz, who would have existed in 1149, married to Ouroana Rodrigues. Son of Moninho Viegas, lord with possessions in Arouca, where Mór Martins was abbess, daughter (or descendant) of this Martim.

== Legacy ==
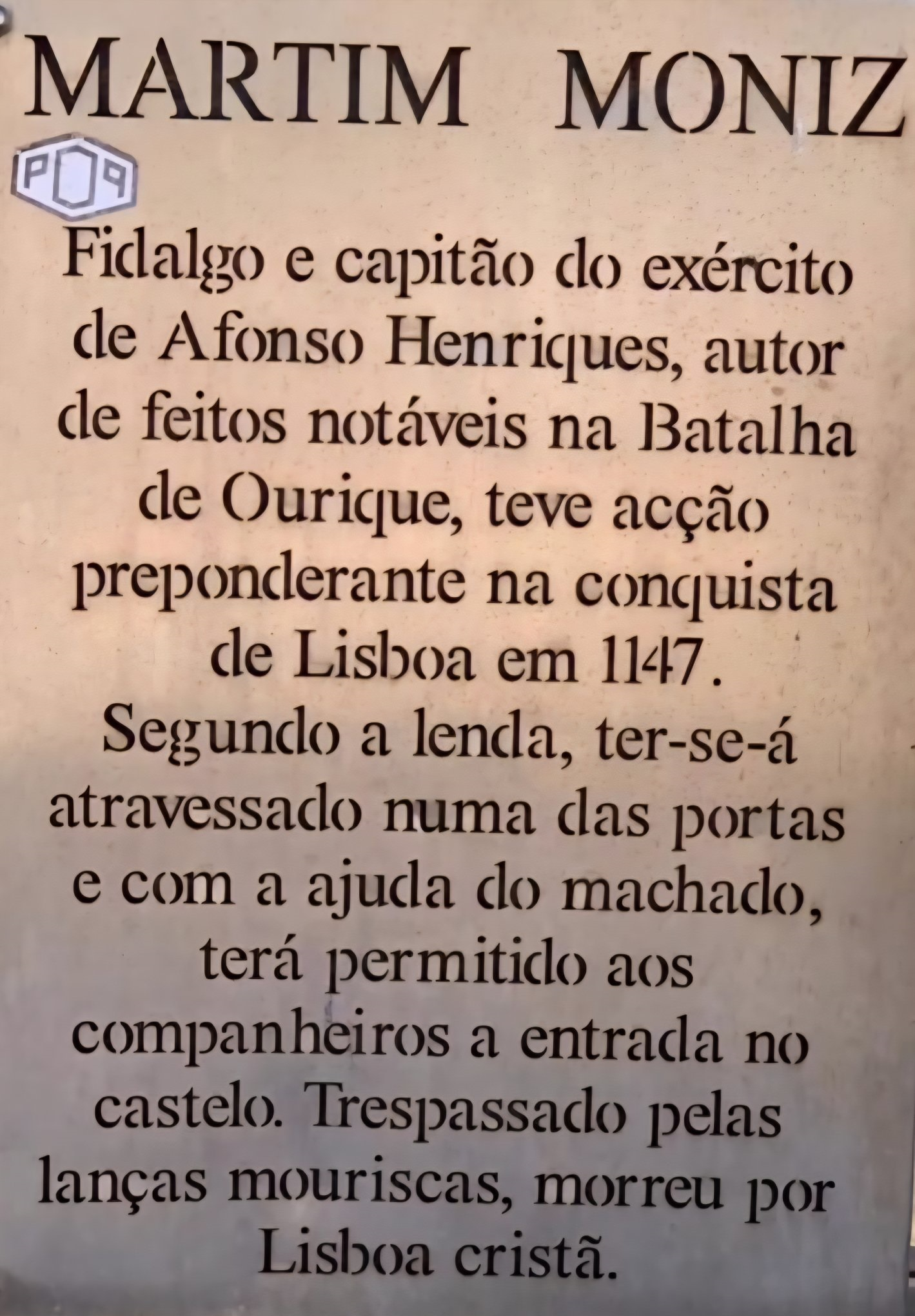
Plate honouring his servitude for the country

There are currently several monuments and parks named after Martim Moniz in Lisbon.

One of Lisbon's metro stations is named after him, the Martim Moniz station. The station features a stylized graphic depiction of the event on its walls.

Martim Moniz square in the center of Lisbon is named after him, where a commemorative plaque recounting the legend is placed.

A bust of Martim Moniz is in a niche above the Martim Moniz Gate, located in the walls of São Jorge Castle in Lisbon.

"A nobleman and captain in the army of King Afonso Henriques, author of notable feats in the Battle of Ourique, he played a preponderant role in the conquest of Lisbon in 1147. According to legend, he is said to have blocked one of the gates and, with the help of an axe, allowed his companions to enter the castle. Pierced by Moorish lances, he died for a Christian Lisbon."
