= Order of Rio Branco =

Honorific order of Brazil

Order of Rio Branco (Ordem de Rio Branco)
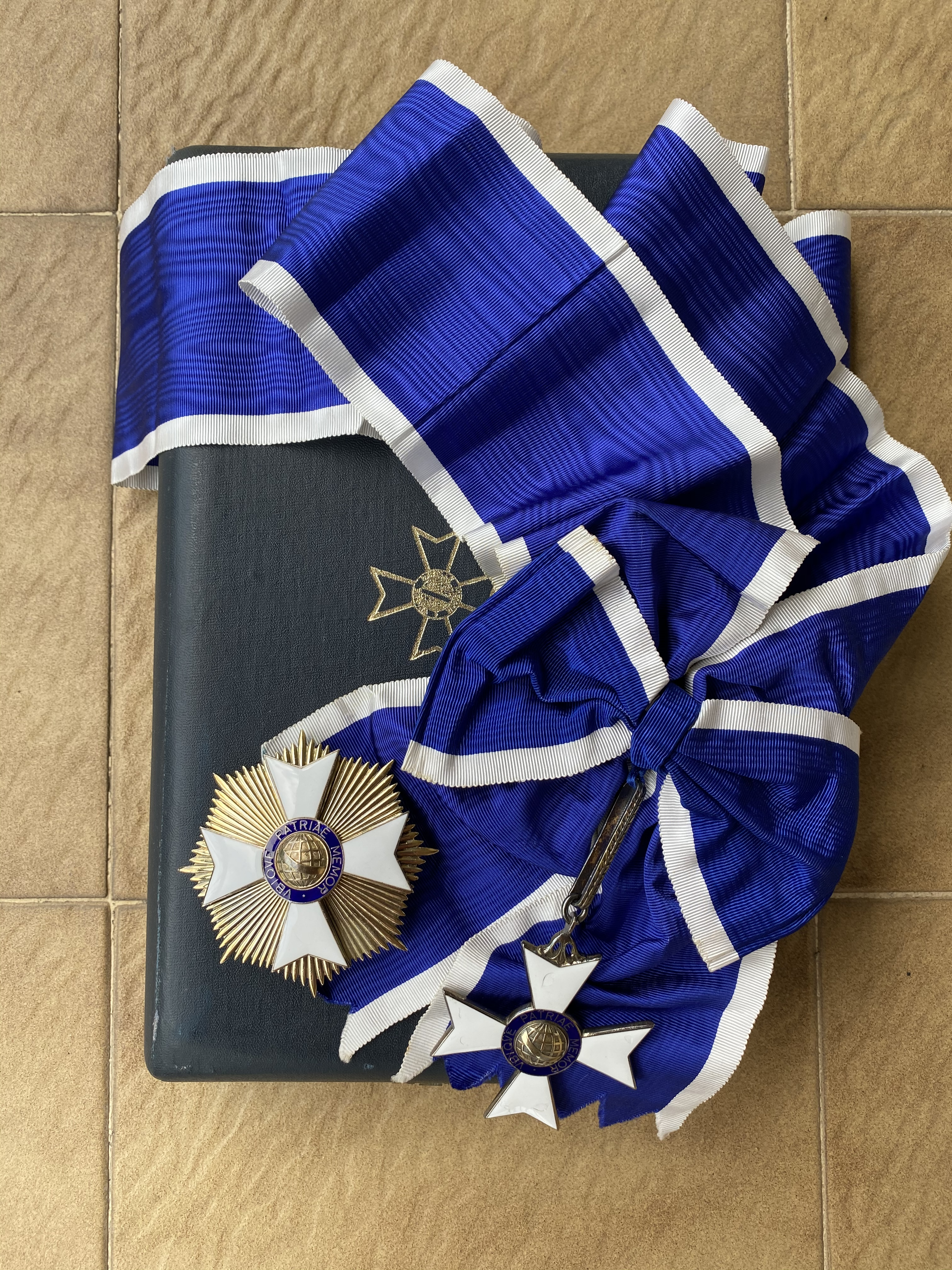
- Grand Cross insignia of the Order of Rio Branco.

Awarded by President of Brazil
- Type: Order
- Established: 5 February 1963
- Motto: UBIQUE PATRIAE MEMOR
- Awarded for: Services to the state of Brazil
- Status: Currently awarded
- Founder: João Goulart
- Grand Master: The President of Brazil
- Chancellor: The Minister of Foreign Affairs
- Grades: Grand Cross; Grand Officer; Commander; Officer; Knight; Medal

The Order of Rio Branco (Ordem de Rio Branco) is an honorific order of Brazil instituted by decree 51.697 of February 5, 1963. It is named in honor of the Brazilian diplomat José Paranhos, Baron of Rio Branco.

The President of Brazil serves as the Grand Master of the Order while the Minister of Foreign Affairs is the order's Chancellor.

== Ranks ==
The order is composed of six ranks of merit :

- Grand Cross (unlimited)
- Grand Officer (60 members)
- Commander (50 members)
- Officer (40 members)
- Knight (30 members)
- Medal (unlimited)

== Insignia ==
The ribbon of the medal is blue with white borders.

Ribbon bars
Medal	Knight	Officer	Commander	Grand Officer	Grand Cross

== Notable recipients ==
- Grand Crosses
  - Ban Ki-moon
  - Maria Barroso
  - Abdelouahed Belkeziz
  - Prince Carl Philip, Duke of Värmland
  - Olavo de Carvalho
  - Pierre-François Forissier
  - Frederik X of Denmark
  - Édouard Guillaud
  - Onno Hattinga van't Sant
  - Princess Madeleine, Duchess of Hälsingland and Gästrikland
  - Jean-Paul Paloméros
  - Alfredo Pareja Diezcanseco
  - Vasco Joaquim Rocha Vieira
  - Rudolf Schuster
  - Sadao Watanabe
  - Mako Komuro, formerly Princess Mako of Akishino
- Grand Officers
  - Beatriz Consuelo
  - Vicente Blanco Gaspar
  - Duarte de Freitas do Amaral
  - Valdecy Urquiza
- Commanders
  - Ayrton Senna
  - Marta
  - Laurindo Almeida
  - Celso Antunes
  - Silvio Barbato
  - Gerard Béhague
  - Luiz Bevilacqua
  - Augustin Buzura
  - António Costa
  - Richard Descoings
  - Graciano García García
  - Gilberto Gil
  - Rita Lee
  - Marius Haas
  - Angela Villela Olinto
  - Andrew Parsons
  - Edmond Safra
  - Álvaro de Vasconcelos
  - Adnan Kassar
- Officer
  - Cafu
  - Grzegorz Hajdarowicz
  - Maria da Conceição Tavares
  - Toots Thielemans
  - Simona Miculescu
  - Riordan Roett
  - Roberto Ladijanski
- Knights
  - Pelé
  - Charlie Byrd
  - Ryuichi Sakamoto
  - Maha Mamo
- Medal
  - Renato Aragão
  - Elizabeth Bishop
  - Yeda Pessoa de Castro
  - Alfredo Chiaradía
  - Maria d'Apparecida
  - Eli Whitney Debevoise II
  - Tewolde Gebremariam
  - Nahum Goldmann
  - José Graziano da Silva
  - Enrique V. Iglesias
  - Ivan Izquierdo
  - Álvaro Manzano
  - Milinda Moragoda
  - Airto Moreira
  - Marlos Nobre
  - Fayga Ostrower
  - Flora Purim
  - Ciro de Quadros
  - Marcelo Sánchez Sorondo
  - Edouard Saouma
  - Mario Silva
  - Peter Sutherland
  - Vladimir Vasiliev
  - Inger Wikström
