= Maria d'Apparecida =

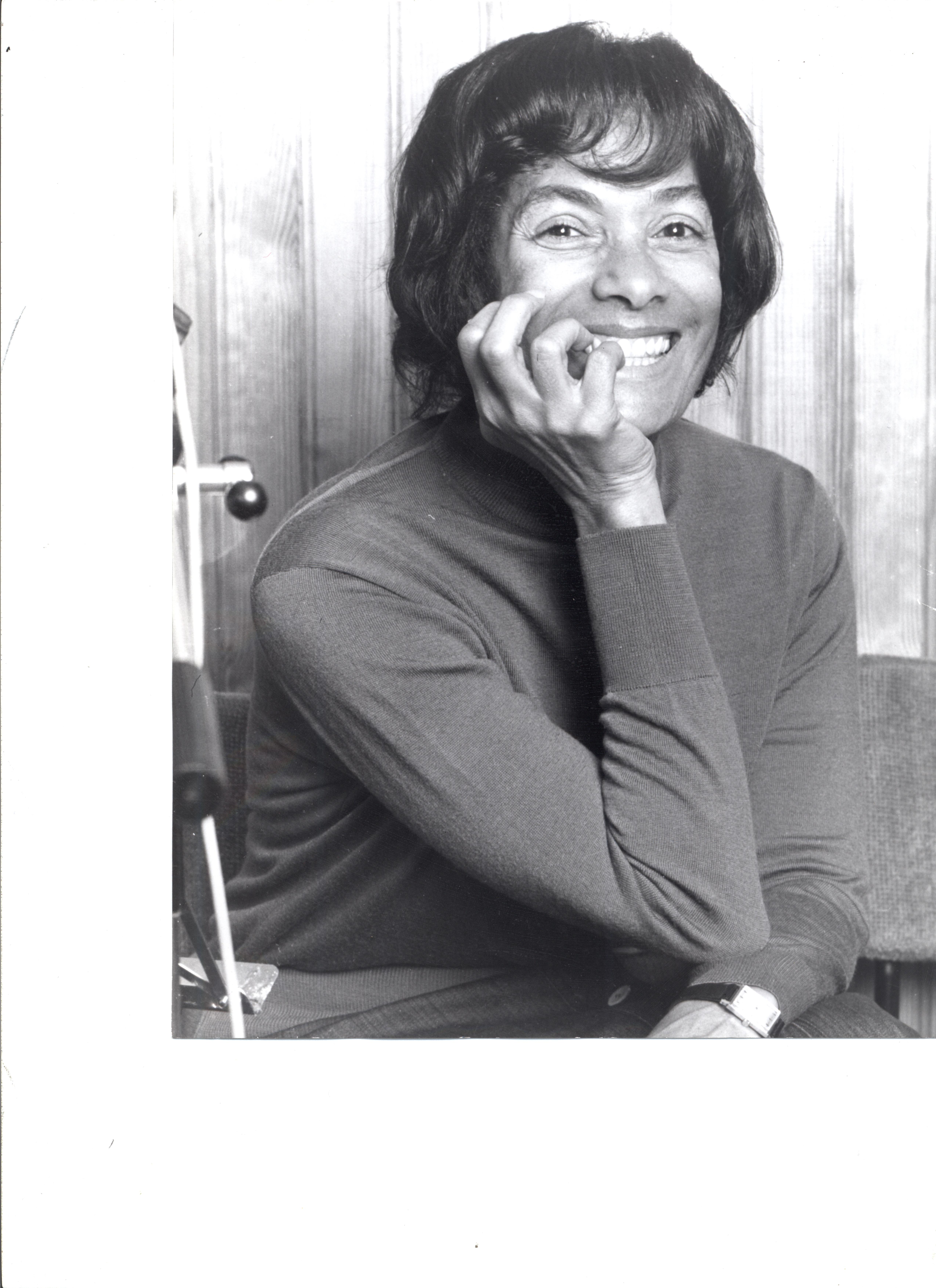
- D'Apparecida in 1977

Background information
- Born: Maria d'Apparecida Marques; 17 January 1926; Rio de Janeiro, Brazil
- Died: 4 July 2017 (aged 91) Paris, France
- Genre: Opera
- Occupation: Singer
- Years active: 1959–2000
- Partner: Félix Labisse

Maria d'Apparecida Marques (17 January 1926 – 4 July 2017) was a Brazilian opera singer. She began her working career as a primary school teacher in Rio de Janeiro before becoming an announcer on various Brazilian radio broadcast stations. D'Apparecida had become a singer just as she was told she not join the city's Theatro Municipal because she was black and faced racial discrimination in Brazil. She relocated to Europe, giving recitals, appearing in concerts, at festivals and in major French opera houses. D'Apparecida was the first black female Latin American to play Carmen at the Paris Opera and the first black Latin American woman to perform with the company. She was a recipient of various awards and decorations such as the Officier of the Ordre des Arts et des Lettres, the Chevalier of the Légion d'honneur, the Medal of the City of Paris and the Medal of the Order of Rio Branco.

== Early life and education ==
D'Apparecida was born in Rio de Janeiro, Brazil, on 17 January 1926; French documents listed her birth year as 1936. She was the daughter of the maid Dulce Marques (née Adelino), (who became pregnant by her employer's son in São Paulo), and the teacher Sylvio Marques. Following the death of D'Apparecida's mother of tuberculosis when her daughter was eight and lost contact with her father because of him becoming distant, she was raised by her paternal middle-class family in Tijuca, although she was never legally adopted by them. She was educated at the Normal School of Rio de Janeiro, then dance, piano and singing at the Conservatório Brasileiro de Música in Rio de Janeiro at the age of 23, the Conservatoire de Paris and the École Normale de Musique de Paris; D'Apparecida had imagined a career in opera when she saw African-American singers such as soprano Jessye Norman touring at the Rio de Janeiro city observatory.

== Career ==
She began her career working as a primary school teacher on the outskirts of Rio de Janeiro until she decided on a career change. Between 1955 and 1958, D'Apparecida worked as an announcer at various Brazilian radio stations. She wanted to work at the Theatro Municipal in Rio de Janeiro, but was told by an Italian-Brazilian businessperson in the conservative carioca society of the 1950s that "You have a beautiful voice, but you are black. And black women don't sing at the Municipal Theater." D'Apparecida, a mezzo-soprano, took up lyrical music after being encouraged to do so by the pianist, soprano and teacher Graziela de Salerno. She won a medal at a singing competition in Italy promoted by the Brazilian Press Association. D'Apparecida decided to move to Paris, France with the composer Waldemar Henrique in 1959 because she was disillusioned with possible lyrical singing work in Brazil, where she was frequently harassed and faced racial discrimination. In 1961, she joined the Théâtre de l'Odéon, performing recitals of Brazilian melody songs. She also performed the role of Dido in Henry Purcell's Dido and Aeneas and Georges Bizet's Carmen at the Grand Théâtre de Bordeaux in 1962, the latter washer first major performance in a French theatre.

In September 1965, D'Apparecida made her only stage appearance in Brazil, portraying Carmen with the Paris Opera at the Theatro Municipal do Rio in Rio de Janeiro. That same year, the Paris Opera employed her to replace the unwell Maria Callas as Carmen. D'Apparecida became the first black Latin American female to portray Carmen at the Paris Opera as well as the first black Latin American woman to perform with the company. In 1967, she was featured in the premiere of Fiançailles à Saint-Domingue at the Grand Théâtre de Bordeaux and in Lucrèce de Padoue at Théâtre Gérard Philipe in Saint-Denis. D'Apparecida interpreted L'heure espagnole at the Opéra-Comique in Paris in 1972. A major car accident involving a taxi failing to stop at a red light and crashing into her windshield in Brussels on 24 December 1974 required her to cease lyrical singing because she was no longer able to sing high notes since she would be in severe pain. D'Apparecida took three years to recover from the accident before resuming lyrical signing although she was no longer able to perform an entire opera.

In 1977, D'Apparecida recorded the album Maria D'Apparecida et Baden Powell with the guitarist Baden Powell and 20 others. She did recitals and concerts at multiple theatres in Paris and conducted at Bobino in 1978. D'Apparecida was in the 1988 show Canta o Brazil at the Carré Sylvia Monfort. She partook in numerous festivals in France and overseas, being named General Delegate for Brazil in 1992, and touring South America in 2000. D'Apparecida did not face discrimination in France, and recorded more than 20 albums.

== Personal life ==
D'Apparecida was a devout Roman Catholic. She was in a relationship with the French surrealist painter Félix Labisse; she was unmarried with no children. D'Apparecida rarely returned to Brazil upon leaving for France, although she did not become a French national. She was found dead in her apartment in the 16th arrondissement of Paris on 4 July 2017. D'Apparecida's cause of death was listed as natural causes. The Consulado-Geral do Brasil em Paris in Paris had difficulty locating one of her relatives until the Federal Police of Brazil were contacted and it located a nephew. She was buried at the Cimetière parisien de Bagneux in Paris' southern outskirts on the afternoon of 8 September 2017 and a mass to honour her memory took place the following morning at Saint-Pierre-de-Chaillot in Paris.

== Legacy ==
A biography of D'Apparecida Maria d'Apparecida – Negroluminosa Voz was authored by the Brazilian writer Mazé Torquato Chotil. An association called Les amis de Maria d'Apparecida (The friends of Maria d'Apparecida) was established to preserve her memory and the poem A Voz by Carlos Drummond de Andrade was dedicated to her. D'Apparecida is portrayed by Dione Carlos in the 2021 five-episode web series Maria d'Apparecida: Luz Negra.

== Awards ==
She was decorated with awards from both Brazil and France. D'Apparecida was appointed as Officier of the Ordre des Arts et des Lettres and the Chevalier of the Légion d'honneur from François Mitterrand, the President of France. She was given the Medal of the City of Paris by Jacques Chirac, the then Mayor of Paris. D'Apparecida was given a Medal of the Order of Rio Branco. Other awards she received were the Grand Prize of the French Lyric Record Academy; the gold medal and Honorary Diploma of Brazilian Merit Carlos Gomes; Orphee d'Or (1969); Spring of Sweden Prize (1971); the Printemps en Suède (1972); Honorary Citizen of the City of Rio de Janeiro (1981); the Grand Prix International du record from the Académie Charles Cros for the record Brasileirissimo (1988) and the Great Gold medal of the Société d'Encouragement au Progrès.
