= Vasconcelos =

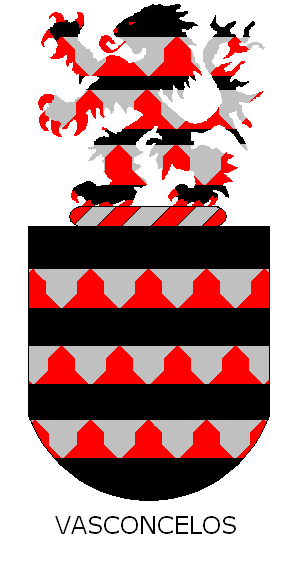
- Vasconcelos family Coat of Arms.
- Country: Portugal
- Founded: 12th century
- Titles: Archbishop of Goa (non hereditary); Cardinal (non hereditary); Grand Master of the Knights Hospitaller (non hereditary); Marquis of Castelo Melhor; Marquis of Reriz; Marquis of Monserrate; Count of Castelo Melhor; Count of Vila Real; Count of Torres Novas; Viscount of Monserrate; Viscount of Almeida and Vasconcelos; Baron of Albufeira; Baron of São Pedro; Baron of Vasconcelos; Baron of Itaipava; Majorat of Mateus
- Estate: Mateus Palace

Vasconcelos (also Vasconcellos) is a Portuguese surname. Today it can be found in Portugal, Brazil, and elsewhere in the Portuguese-speaking world.

== People ==
=== General ===
- Aires de Ornelas e Vasconcelos (1837–1880), Portuguese Roman Catholic Archbishop of Goa, India, in the 19th century.
- Álvaro de Vasconcelos (born 1944), is a Portuguese author and security analyst
- António-Pedro Vasconcelos (1939–2024), Portuguese film director.
- Augusto de Vasconcelos (1867–1951), Portuguese surgeon, politician and diplomat.
- Carlos Carmelo Vasconcellos Motta (1890–1982), Brazilian cardinal.
- Carolina Michaëlis de Vasconcellos (1851–1925), Portuguese philologist.
- Doroteo Vasconcelos (1803–1883), President of El Salvador in the 19th century.
- Fernanda Vasconcellos (born 1984), a Brazilian movie, theater and television actress.
- Héctor Vasconcelos, Mexican diplomat
- Joe Vasconcellos (born 1959), Chilean musician
- John Vasconcellos (1932–2014), American politician.
- José Leite de Vasconcelos Cardoso Pereira de Melo (1858–1941), Portuguese linguist, philologist and ethnographer.
- José Maria Botelho de Vasconcelos (born 1950), Angolan politician.
- José Mauro de Vasconcelos (1920–1984), Brazilian writer.
- José Vasconcelos (1882–1959), Mexican writer, philosopher and politician.
- Josefina de Vasconcellos (1904–2005), English sculptor.
- Luís de Vasconcelos e Sousa, 3rd Count of Castelo Melhor (1636–1720), Portuguese politician and prime minister.
- Lucile Vasconcellos Langhanke, known as Mary Astor (1906–1987), American actress.
- Luis Mendez de Vasconcellos (c.1542-1623), Portuguese Grand Master of the Knights Hospitaller.
- Maria de Vasconcelos (born 1970), Portuguese psychiatrist, singer and songwriter
- Mário Cesariny de Vasconcelos (1923–2006), Portuguese surrealist poet.
- Marta Teresa Smith de Vasconcellos Suplicy (born 1945), Brazilian politician and psychologist.
- Martha Vasconcellos (born c.1948), Brazilian model and Miss Universe 1968.
- Miguel de Vasconcelos (c.1590-1640), Prime Minister of Portugal in the 17th century.
- Naná Vasconcelos (1944-2016), Brazilian percussionist.
- Pedro Martins, Lord of the Tower of Vasconcelos, 12th-century Portuguese nobleman, son of Martim Moniz and the first to use the name Vasconcelos.
- Pedro Vasconcellos (born 1974), Brazilian television actor.
- Wanda Ribeiro de Vasconcelos, known as Lio (born 1962), Belgian singer and actress

=== Sports ===
- Ana Vasconcelos (born 1981), Brazilian water polo player.
- Camilo Vasconcelos (born 2005), Canadian soccer player
- Fernando De Almeida Vasconcellos (1919–1996), Brazilian chess master.
- Gabriel Monteiro Vasconcelos (born 1996), Brazilian footballer
- Gabriel Vasconcelos Ferreira (born 1992), Brazilian footballer
- Júlia Vasconcelos (born 1992), Brazilian taekwondo competitor.
- Marco Vasconcelos (born 1971), Portuguese badminton player.
- Ricardo Vasconcelos (born 1997), South African cricketer
- Severino Vasconcelos (born 1953), Brazilian naturalized Chilean football player and manager
- Wálter Vasconcelos Fernandes (1930–1983), Brazilian footballer
- João Vasconcelos (born 2005), Portuguese footballer
- Nora Gilda Vasconcellos (born 1992), USA skateboarder. 2017 Vans Park Series World Champion, first female member of Adidas Skateboard Team.

== Other ==
- Alfredo Vasconcelos, city in Minas Gerais, Brazil.
- Diogo de Vasconcelos, city in Minas Gerais, Brazil.
- Countess de Vasconcellos, fictional characters of the video game Broken Sword: The Shadow of the Templars.
- Eduardo Vasconcelos Stadium, stadium in Oaxaca, Mexico.
- Ferraz de Vasconcelos, suburban municipality in São Paulo, Brazil.
- Estádio Dr. João Cláudio Vasconcelos Machado, multi-use stadium in Natal, Rio Grande do Norte, Brazil.
- José Vasconcelos Library, in Mexico City, Mexico.
- Senador Vasconcelos, neighbourhood in Rio de Janeiro, Brazil.
