= Siege of Lisbon (1142) =

Failed Portuguese Reconquista siege

- Part of the Portuguese Reconquista
Date	Summer of 1142 (?)
Location	Lisbon, Portugal
Result	Crusader forces failed to capture Lisbon

Belligerents
Kingdom of Portugal; Crusaders	Almoravid dynasty

Commanders and leaders
Afonso I of Portugal; William Vitalus; Ralph Vitalus	Unknown

Strength
Unknown Portuguese forces; 70 Ships of Anglo-Norman Crusaders	Unknown

In or about 1142 according to a brief reference in the Anglo-Norman text known as De expugnatione Lyxbonensi and the Portuguese text known as the Chronica Gothorum, a group of Anglo-Norman crusaders on their way to Jerusalem were invited by King Afonso I Henriques of Portugal to participate in an attempt to capture the Almoravid-controlled city of Lisbon. The Anglo-Norman forces might have been led by the brothers William and Ralph Vitalus as it is implied by the De expugnatione Lyxbonensi.

According to the sources, the crusaders and the Portuguese monarch agreed to capture the city but they were too few in number to be able to sustain a long siege of the city which according to sources was very populous and well supplied. Alternatively, the Christian forces resorted to destroying the outskirts of the city before departing. According to the Chronica Gothorum, the Anglo-Norman Crusaders continued on their way to the Holy Land, while the Portuguese returned to their territory. It seems that the inability of the Christian forces to capture Lisbon left some of the Anglo-Norman Crusaders dissatisfied with their Portuguese allies resolve. This would later hinder the negotiations between Afonso Henriques and the Crusader forces that ultimately helped him in the Siege of Lisbon in 1147 as part of the Second Crusade.

Ultimately, however, despite the failure to capture Lisbon, the campaign did provide the Portuguese monarch with a precedent for the later cooperation with Northern Crusaders in the capture of the city in 1147. On the other hand, this fiasco probably convinced the Portuguese monarch of the need to close the river supply lines of the city by capturing Santarem.
