= São Jorge Castle =

Historic castle in Lisbon, Portugal

São Jorge Castle Saint George's Castle
- Castelo de São Jorge
- Lisbon in Portugal
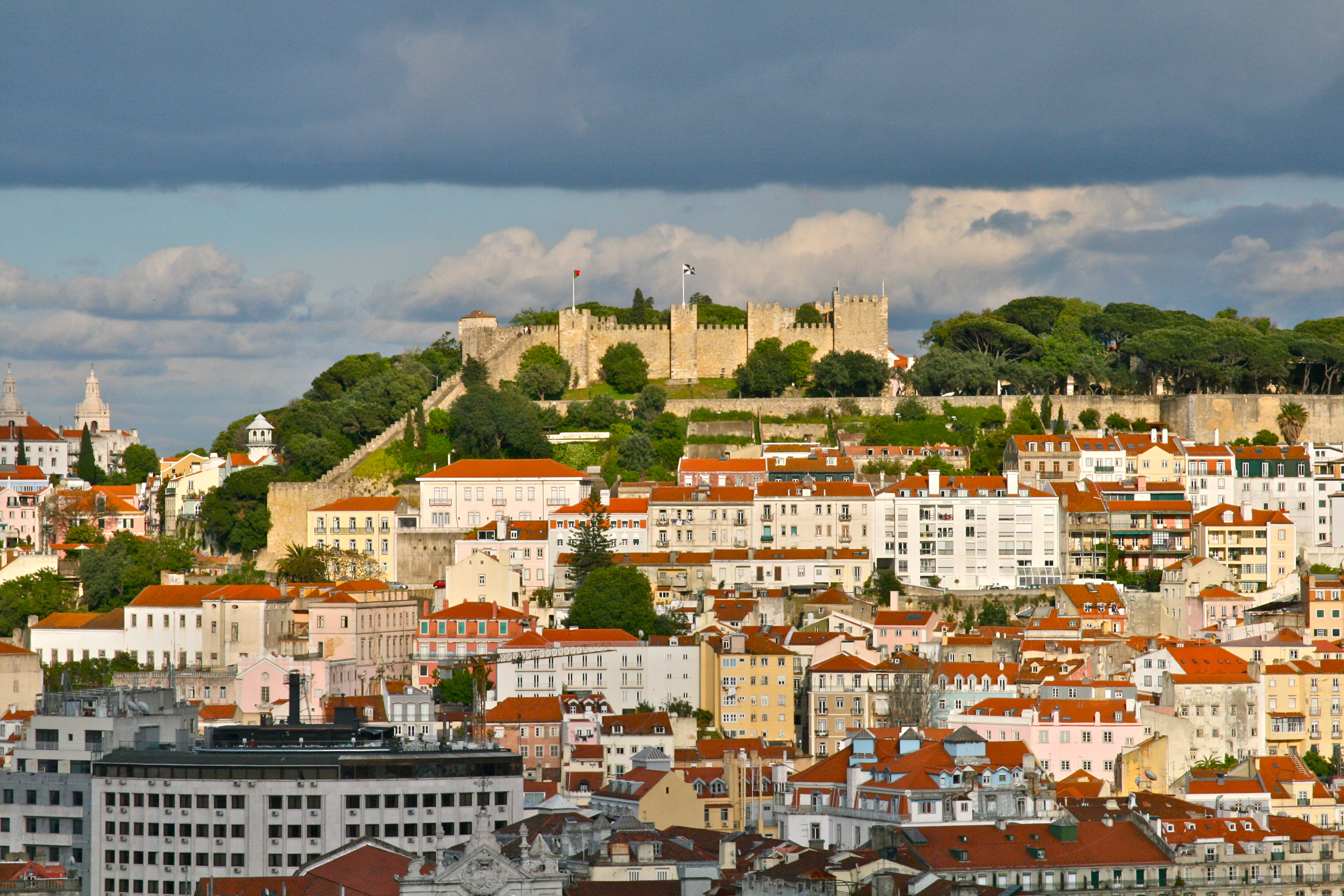
- The visible profile of Saint George's Castle overlooking the historical center of Lisbon.

Site information
- Type: Castle
- Owner: Government of Portugal
- Operator: Câmara Municipal de Lisboa
- Open to the public: Public
- Website: castelodesaojorge.pt

Location
- Location of the castle within the municipality of Lisbon
- Location within Lisbon
- Coordinates: 38°42′50″N 9°08′01″W

Site history
- Built by: Kings of Portugal, most notably Ferdinand I, Denis and Sebastian; João Fernandes and Vasco Brás
- Materials: Stone, Granite, Reinforced concrete

São Jorge Castle (Portuguese: Castelo de São Jorge; Portuguese pronunciation: [kɐʃˈtɛlu dɨ sɐ̃w̃ ˈʒɔɾʒɨ]), sometimes known in English as Saint George's Castle, is a historic castle in the Portuguese capital of Lisbon, located in the freguesia of Santa Maria Maior. Human occupation of the castle hill dates to at least the 8th century BC while the oldest fortifications on the site date from the 2nd century BC. The hill on which Saint George's Castle stands has played an important part in the history of Lisbon, having served as the location of fortifications occupied successively by Phoenicians, Carthaginians, Romans, and Moors, before its conquest by the Portuguese in the 1147 Siege of Lisbon. Since the 12th century, the castle has variously served as a royal palace, a military barracks, home of the Torre do Tombo National Archive, and now as a national monument and museum.

== History ==
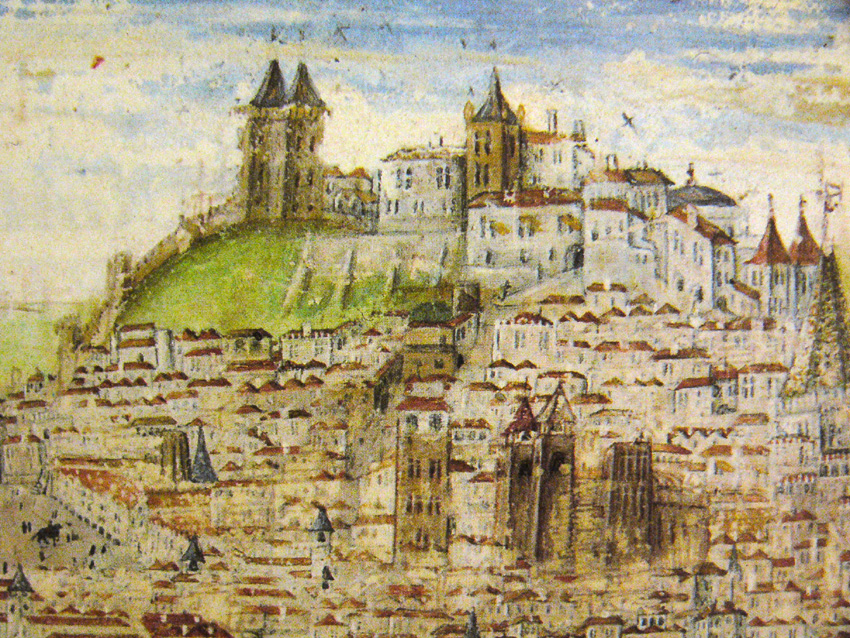
A 16th-century illuminated manuscript of Lisbon, in the Crónica de D. Afonso Henriques by Duarte Galvão, depicting the castle and walls, including the Royal Palace (Alcáçova) (1505)

Caravels and carracks in the Tagus River, with the castle in the centre distance, unknown artist (1572)

Although the first fortifications on this hilltop date from the 1st century BC, archaeological excavations have identified a human presence in the Tagus valley as far back as the 8th century BC. The first fortification was, presumably, erected in 48 BC, when Lisbon was classified as a Roman municipality.

The hill was first used by Celtic tribes, then by Phoenicians, followed by Greeks and later the Carthaginians as a defensive outpost that was later expropriated successively by the Romans, the Suebi, the Visigoths, and the Moors. During the 10th century, the fortifications were built by the Moors; these included the walls or Cerca Moura ("Moorish Encirclement").

=== Kingdom ===
In the context of the Christian Reconquista, the castle and the city of Lisbon was conquered from the Moorish Almoravid dynasty in 1147 by Afonso Henriques and northern European knights in the Siege of Lisbon during the Second Crusade; this victory was the only notable success of that failed crusade. According to an oft-repeated legend, the knight Martim Moniz, noticing that one of the doors to the castle was open, prevented the Moors from closing it by throwing his own body into the breach, thus allowing Christian soldiers to enter at the cost of his own life. With the taking of the castle Christian forces were able to maintain the defense of Lisbon until the end of the 12th century.

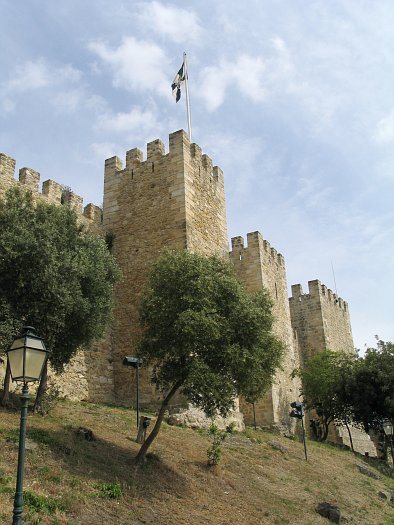
The castle walls and towers, constructed during the Moorish occupation of Lisbon

When Lisbon became the capital of the Kingdom of Portugal in 1255, the castle served as the alcáçova, a fortified residence for Afonso III, in his role as governor. It was extensively renovated around 1300 by King Denis, transforming the Moorish alcáçova into the Royal Palace of the Alcáçova. Between 1373 and 1375, King Ferdinand I ordered the building of the Cerca Nova or Cerca Fernandina, the walled compound that enclosed all but the north flank of the castle. (Note: 1:5000 scale Lisbon 1856/58 map foldout) The master builders João Fernandes and Vasco Brás were responsible for its construction. This wall, which partially replaced the old Moorish walls, was designed to encircle previously unprotected parts of the city. Completed in two years, it had 77 towers, 34 or 38 gates, and a perimeter of 5,400 metres (17,700 ft).

The castle and the city resisted the forces of Castile several times during the 14th century (notably in 1373 and in 1383–1384). It was during this period (the late 14th century) that the castle was dedicated to Saint George by King John I, who had married the English princess Philippa of Lancaster. Saint George, the warrior-saint, was normally represented slaying a dragon, and was very popular in both countries.

From 1378 onwards many of the kingdom's records were housed in the Torre do Tombo (literally, "Tower of the Archive"), also known as the Torre Albarrã, until the earthquake of 1755 (a tower that is known today as Tower of Ulysses). The Portuguese Royal Archive, where the eminent Portuguese chroniclers Fernão Lopes, Gomes Eanes de Zurara and Damião de Góis once worked, is still referred to as the Torre do Tombo, due to its original location in one of the towers of the Lisbon Castle. On 9 December 1448, Gil Pires was named the castle master builder to replace Afonso Esteves, being paid 400 réis for his work. Between 1448 and 1451, the master builder was paid several stipends for his work on the palace. Similarly, the mason João de Alverca was paid a substantial sum for stonework. These public works continued from 1449 until 1452, with additional payments being made for labor and materials to convert the building from a fortified castle to a royal residence.

In the beginning of the 15th century, a royal menagerie was established in the Royal Palace of Lisbon, located nearby the Castle of Saint George. Following the conquest of Ceuta in 1415, King John I of Portugal brought back to Lisbon two Barbary lions, and they were installed in a large room inside his Palace in the Citadel of Lisbon. This area of the Palace came to be known as Casa dos Leões (the "Lions' House"); today the area is occupied by a famed restaurant with the same name. Later that century, German humanist Hieronymus Münzer spent five days in Lisbon in 1494, and learned about the lions, claiming to be the most beautiful wild beasts he had ever seen.

As the royal palace, the castle was the setting for the reception by King Manuel I of the navigator Vasco da Gama when he returned from discovering the maritime route to India in 1498. The castle also served as a theater in 1502 when pioneering playwright Gil Vicente staged his Monólogo do Vaqueiro to honor the birth of Manuel I's son and heir, the future John III.

Around the early 16th century, following the construction of the Ribeira Palace beside the Tagus river, the Palace of Alcáçova began to lose its importance. An earthquake occurring in 1531 further damaged the old castle, contributing further to its decay and neglect. In 1569, King Sebastian ordered the rebuilding of the royal apartments in the castle, intending to use it as his official residence. As part of the rebuilding, in 1577 Filippo Terzi demolished one of the towers near the principal facade of the Church of Loreto. However, many of the works were never completed after the young king's apparent death during the Battle of Alcácer Quibir. The following Portuguese dynastic crisis opened the way for sixty years of Spanish rule and the castle was converted into military barracks and a prison. On 30 December 1642, Teodósio de Frias the Younger was appointed master builder to continue the works begun by his father, Luís de Frias, and his grandfather, Teodósio de Frias. This was part of a greater plan by the Spanish forces to recommission the fortification.

Lisbon seen from São Jorge Castle

However, after Portugal regained its independence following the Portuguese Restoration War, the works were taken over by the Portuguese government. On 6 November 1648, Nicolau de Langres was called upon to take over the design, execution and construction of a new fortification that would surround the Castle of Saint George and the city walls of Lisbon. In 1650 the military architect Mateus do Couto was named master builder of the project and reconstruction took on a new formality: although the military engineer João Gillot built new walls in 1652, construction again followed Couto's plans between 1657 and 1733. In 1673, the Soldiers' Hospital, dedicated to São João de Deus (St John of God), was installed on the grounds beside the Rua do Recolhimento. At the end of the 17th century the Recolhimento do Castelo ("Castle Shelter") was constructed along the southeast angle of the courtyard, and in 1733, new projects were initiated by master Custódio Vieira.

The 1755 Lisbon earthquake severely damaged the castle and contributed to its continuing decay: apart from the walls of the old castle, the soldier's hospital and the Recolhimento were left in ruins. The necessity of maintaining a supporting military force within the capital city required expansion of the site's role of garrison and presidio. From 1780 to 1807, the charitable institution Casa Pia, dedicated to the education of poor children, was established in the citadel, while soldiers continued to be garrisoned on site. Inspired by the events of the earthquake and the following tsunami, the first geodetic observatory in Portugal was constructed in 1788 at the top of one of the towers of the castle, later referred to as the Torre do Observatório (Observatory Tower).

=== Republic ===
By the 1930s, the Castle had all but disappeared as a distinguishable landmark from Lisbon's skyline, being almost entirely obscured behind and under later annexes and additions. As part of the commemorative celebrations marking the foundation of nationhood and restoration of independence (Portuguese: Fundação da Nacionalidade e da Restauração da Independência), the government of António de Oliveira Salazar initiated extensive renovations at the site (as it did with similar castles, such as the ones in Sintra and Silves). Most of the incongruous structures added to the castle compound in previous centuries were demolished, under the supervision of the DGEMN, and there was a partial restoration of the Recolhimento. In addition, on 25 October 1947, a monument dedicated to Afonso Henriques, presented by the city of Porto, of a replica created by Soares dos Reis (in 1887) was installed on the grounds.

On 31 May 1942 the castle's operations began to be handled by the city government of Lisbon, which was reaffirmed on 8 June 1979.

In 1998, the semi-rectangular spaces, columns and cistern were adapted into the museum Olissipónia.

On 22 August 2006, Direcção Regional de Cultura Lisboa (DRCLisboa) defined a special protection zone, that included the Castle of São Jorge and the rest of the walls of Lisbon, the Baixa Pombalina and various properties that were already classified as cultural heritage. The Conselho Nacional de Cultura (National Council of Culture) proposed shelving this definition on 10 October 2011, which was supported by IGESPAR.

== Architecture ==
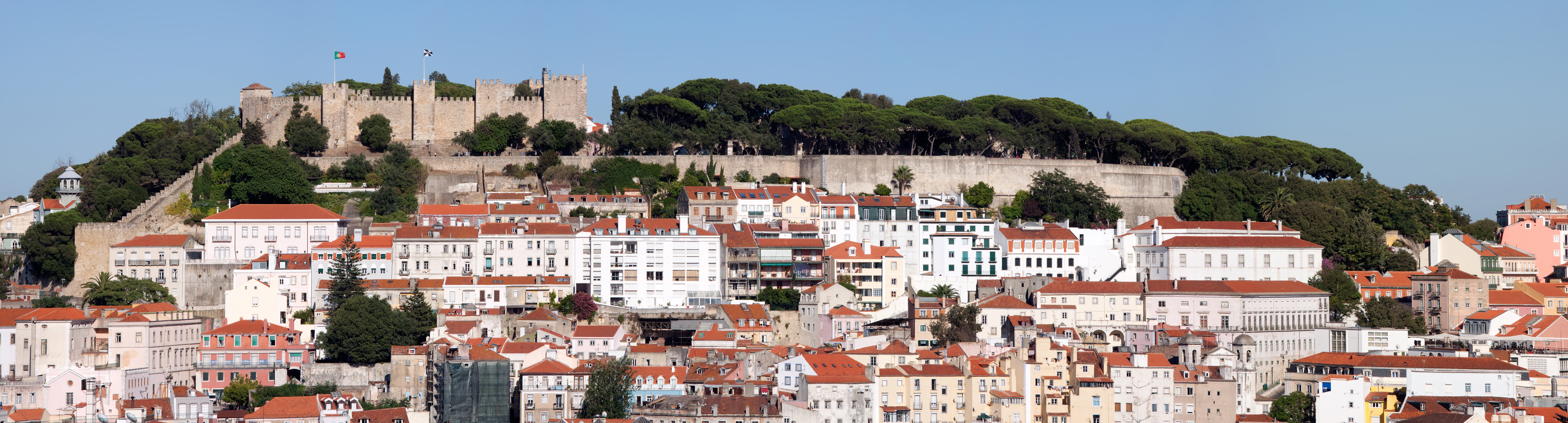
A panorama of the entire Castle of São Jorge

The castle is in the centre of Lisbon, on a hill, while many of its walls extend around the citadel into the civil parishes that surround it to the east and south.

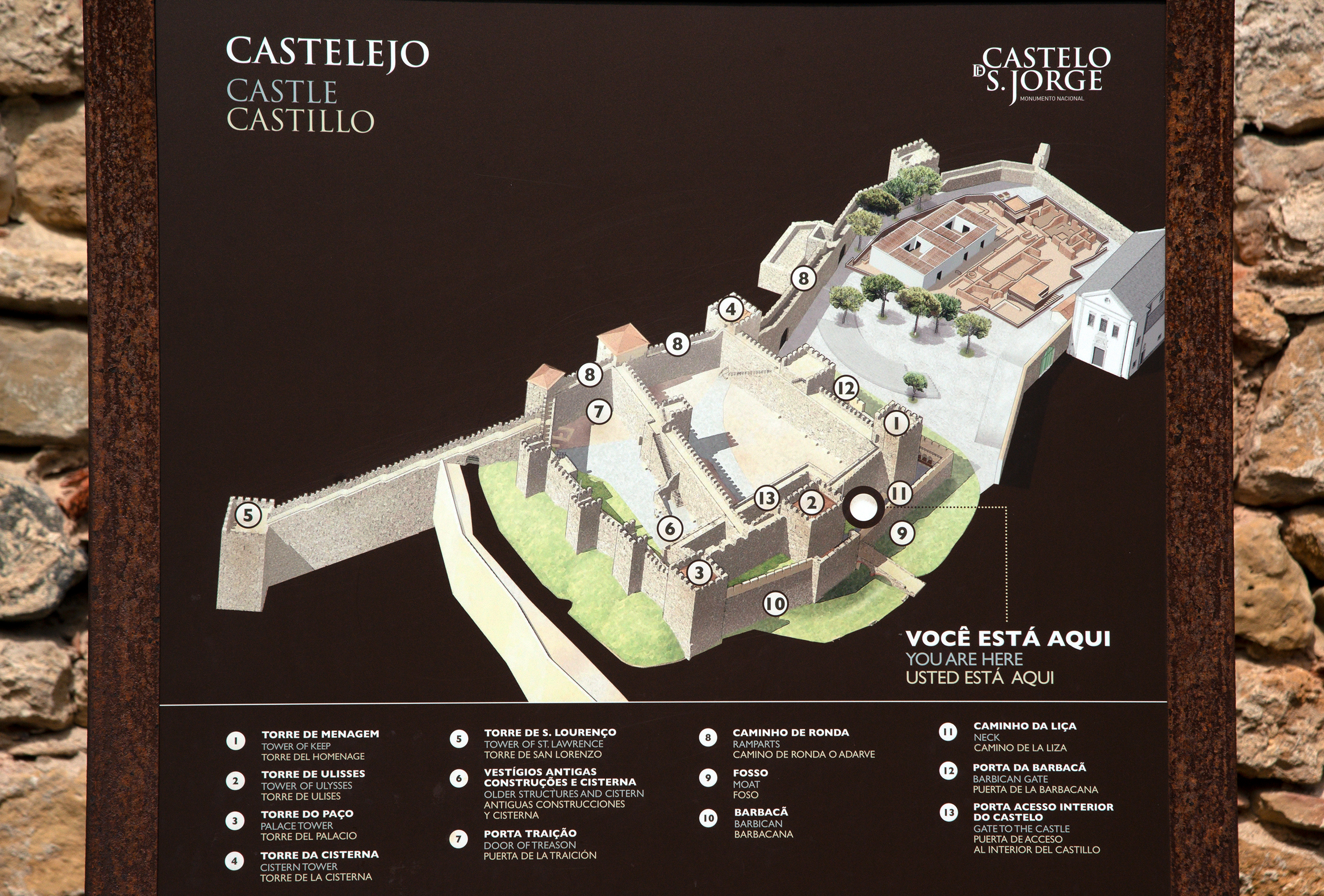
The map helps tourist find areas of interest in the castle

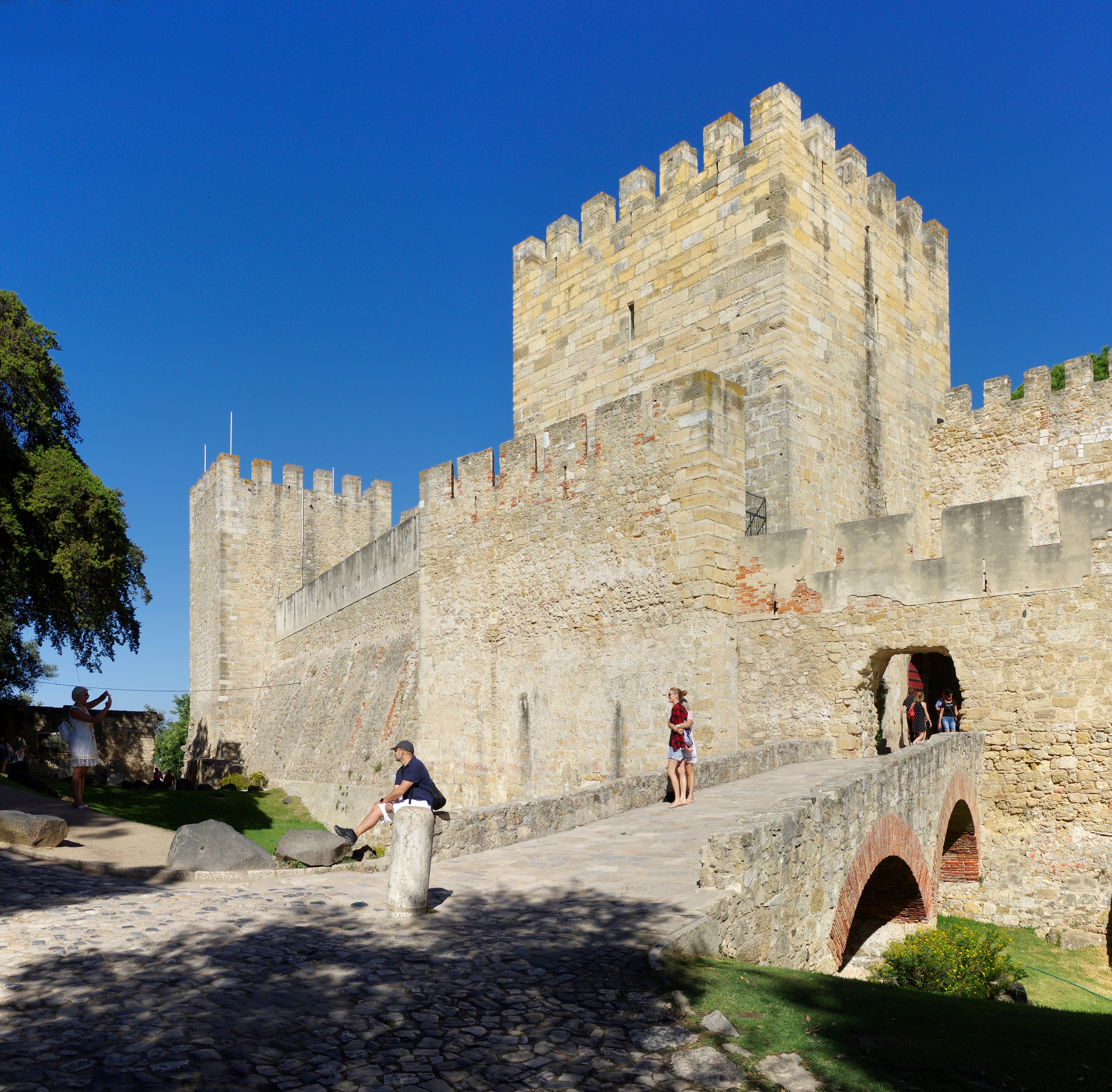
Bridge over the current dry moat

The castle's plan is roughly square, and it was originally encircled by a wall, to form a citadel. The castle complex consists of the castle itself (the castelejo), some ancillary buildings (including the ruins of the royal palace), gardens, and a large terraced square from which an impressive panorama of Lisbon is visible. The main entrance to the citadel is a 19th-century gate surmounted by the coat-of-arms of Portugal, the name of Queen Maria II, and the date 1846. This gate permits access to the main square (Praça d'Armas), which is decorated with old cannons and a bronze statue of Afonso Henriques, the Portuguese monarch who took the castle from the Moors. This statue is a copy of the 19th-century original, by the romantic sculptor António Soares dos Reis, which is located near Guimarães Castle in northern Portugal.

The remnants of the royal palace are located near the main square, but all that is left are some walls and a few rebuilt rooms such as the Casa Ogival. It now hosts the Olissipónia, a multimedia show about the history of Lisbon.

View from the interior of the castle

The medieval castle is located toward the northwest corner of the citadel, at its highest point. Hypothetically, during a siege, if attackers managed to enter the citadel, the castle was the last stronghold, the last place in which to take refuge. It is rectangular, with ten towers. A wall with a tower and a connecting door divides the castle courtyard into halves. A series of stairways allow visitors to reach the walkway atop the wall and the towers, from which magnificent views of Lisbon can be enjoyed. The Tower of Ulysses (where the Torre do Tombo archive used to be) had a camera obscura installed in 1998 that allows spectators a 360-degree view of the city and Tagus River.

Apart from its main walls, the castle is protected, on its southern and eastern sides, by a barbican (barbacã), a low wall that prevented siege engines from approaching the main castle walls. The northern and western sides of the castle, on the other hand, were naturally protected by the steep hillside sloping downward from the castle's foundations. The castle is also partially encircled by a moat, now dry. The main entrance is fronted by a stone bridge across the moat. On the west side, there is a long curtain wall extending downhill, ending at a tower (the Torre de São Lourenço). This tower guarded a gate in the Cerca Fernandina.

== See also ==
- Castles in Portugal
- History of Lisbon

== Gallery ==
Castle viewed from the Rua Augusta Arch

Southern barbican and keep viewed from the entrance

West towers

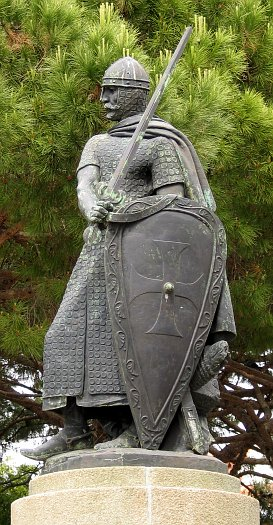
Statue of Afonso Henriques

Castle illuminated at night
