= Marius Haas =

German diplomat (born 1945)

Personal details
- Born: 13 May 1945 (age 80) Trondheim, Norway
- Children: 3

Marius Haas (born 13 May 1945) is a German journalist and diplomat. He was the ambassador of Germany to various countries, including Lebanon and Ghana.

== Early life and education ==
Haas was born in Trondheim, Norway, on 13 May 1945. He studied geography, communication and political sciences.

== Career ==
Haas worked as a journalist between 1971 and 1974. He joined the West German Ministry of Foreign Affairs in 1975 and held various diplomatic posts. He was named as the ambassador of Germany to Myanmar in 1999 and remained in office until 2002. He was the ambassador of Germany to Ivory Coast from 2002 to 2005. He was appointed the ambassador of Germany to Lebanon in 2005 which he held until 2007. Next he was the ambassador of Germany to Ghana between 2007 and 2010.

== Personal life ==
Haas is married and has three children. He is fluent in English, French and Spanish.

=== Awards ===
Haas has received the following awards: Order of United Kingdom, Great Britain and Northern Ireland (Officer), Order of Merit of the Italian Republic (Officer), Order of Swedish Polar Star (Officer), Order of Rio Branco (Brazil; Commander), Order of the General José Dolores Estrala, Batalla de San Jacinto (Nicaragua; Commander), Order of the Liberator (Venezuela; Commander), Order of Gorkha Dakshina Bahu (Nepal; 3rd class), Order of the Aztec Eagle (Mexico; Commander); Royal Norwegian Order of Merit (Commander), Order of the Civil Merit (Portugal; Commander) and Order of Merit of the Federal Republic of Germany (Commander).
