= Hervey de Glanvill =

Anglo-Norman nobleman

Hervey de Glanvill [Glanville] (fl. c. 1140–50) was an Anglo-Norman nobleman and military leader. He was a scion of a younger line of the Glanvill family, which had been established in East Anglia, especially Suffolk, since before 1086. He had several sons and daughters, the most prominent of which was Ranulf de Glanvill, who became justiciar of England.

In 1144, Nigel, bishop of Ely, instructed Hervey and Ranulf to restore to the monks of Ely Cathedral the lands they were possessing at Bawdsey in Suffolk.

In 1147, Hervey was the leader of an East Anglian contingent that joined the Second Crusade. When the fleet mustered at Dartmouth, he and the other crusading leaders formed a sworn commune for the duration of the crusade. During a stop in Portugal on the way to the Holy Land, they were asked by King Afonso I to help him take Muslim-held Lisbon. Hervey dominated the debate in the commune over the king of Portugal's request and, appealing to honour and unity, he convinced the commune to give its assistance. The De expugnatione Lyxbonensi, an eye-witness account of the successful Siege of Lisbon, was probably composed by a member of Hervey's retinue. There is no record, however, that would indicate whether Hervey ever made it to the Holy Land.

In 1150, Hervey took part in a joint meeting of the shire moots of Suffolk and Norfolk in the bishop's garden in Norwich. Also present were Nigel, bishop of Ely, and some other East Anglian tenants-in-chief. Before the moots, royal agents were seeking to set aside the immunities of the Abbey of Bury St Edmunds in order to prosecute a certain Hubert and his accomplices. Hervey gave a speech in opposition to the government, citing his fifty years' experience of the shire moots and the tradition of abbatial independence. His argument was recorded by a neutral eye-witness, and it apparently swayed the assembly.

Hervey was possibly still alive as late as 1166. If his own claim of lengthy experience with the shire courts can be trusted, he was an old man when his son Ranulf was born and a very old man at his death. It has been suggested that there were in fact two Herveys de Glanvill, but the two independent accounts of the Portuguese expedition and the East Anglian moots portray similar figures: eloquent, conservative, familiar with the law.

== Sources ==
- Hudson, John (2004) [online 2007]. "Glanville, Ranulf de (1120s?–1190)". Oxford Dictionary of National Biography. Oxford University Press. doi:10.1093/ref:odnb/10795.
- Tyerman, Christopher J., ed. (1996). Who's Who in Early Medieval England, 1066–1272. Stackpole Books.
