= Maha Mamo =

Brazilian human rights activist (born 1988)

- Maha Mamo in a #IBelong campaign video
- Born: February 29, 1988 (age 38)
- Citizenship: Brazil
- Occupation: Human rights activist
- Awards: Order of Rio Branco
- Website: mahamamo.com

Maha Mamo (born February 29, 1988) is a Brazilian human rights activist. She is an advocate of the United Nations High Commissioner for Refugees' #IBelong campaign, which seeks to end gender discrimination in nationality laws through local and international advocacy.

== Early life ==
Mamo was born in 1988 to Syrian nationals. Her father was Christian and her mother was Muslim, barring them from legal marriage and thus preventing Mamo and her two brothers, Souad and Eddie, from obtaining Syrian citizenship. In absence of identification documents during the Lebanese Civil War, Mamo and her brothers avoided potential security checkpoints, thus restricting them from education and healthcare services.

== Activism ==
In 2014, the Brazilian embassy invited Mamo and her siblings under a special visa for Syrians. Members of the United Nations helped her obtain a travel document, and Mamo began advocating for the creation of legal avenues to citizenship. The New York Times described Mamo as "the face" of this campaign. In 2018, after Brazil legalized stateless people to apply for citizenship, she became a registered citizen of Brazil.
