= Félix Labisse =

French painter

Félix Labisse (March 9, 1905 – January 27, 1982) was a French Surrealist painter, illustrator, and designer.

He was born in Marchiennes. He divided his time between Paris and the Belgian coast from 1927. In Ostend he met James Ensor, who influenced his work. Beginning in 1931 he designed for the theater. His paintings depict fantastical hybrid creatures, and are often erotic. He painted the first of a series of blue women in 1960; among them is the Bain Turquoise.

He was the subject of a film by Alain Resnais, Visite à Félix Labisse (1947). In 1966 he was elected to the Académie des Beaux-Arts. In 1973 his paintings were shown in a retrospective exhibition at the Museum Boijmans Van Beuningen, Rotterdam. He died in Neuilly-sur-Seine in 1982.
