= Siege of Lisbon =

1147 Second Crusade battle

- Part of the Portuguese Reconquista and the Second Crusade
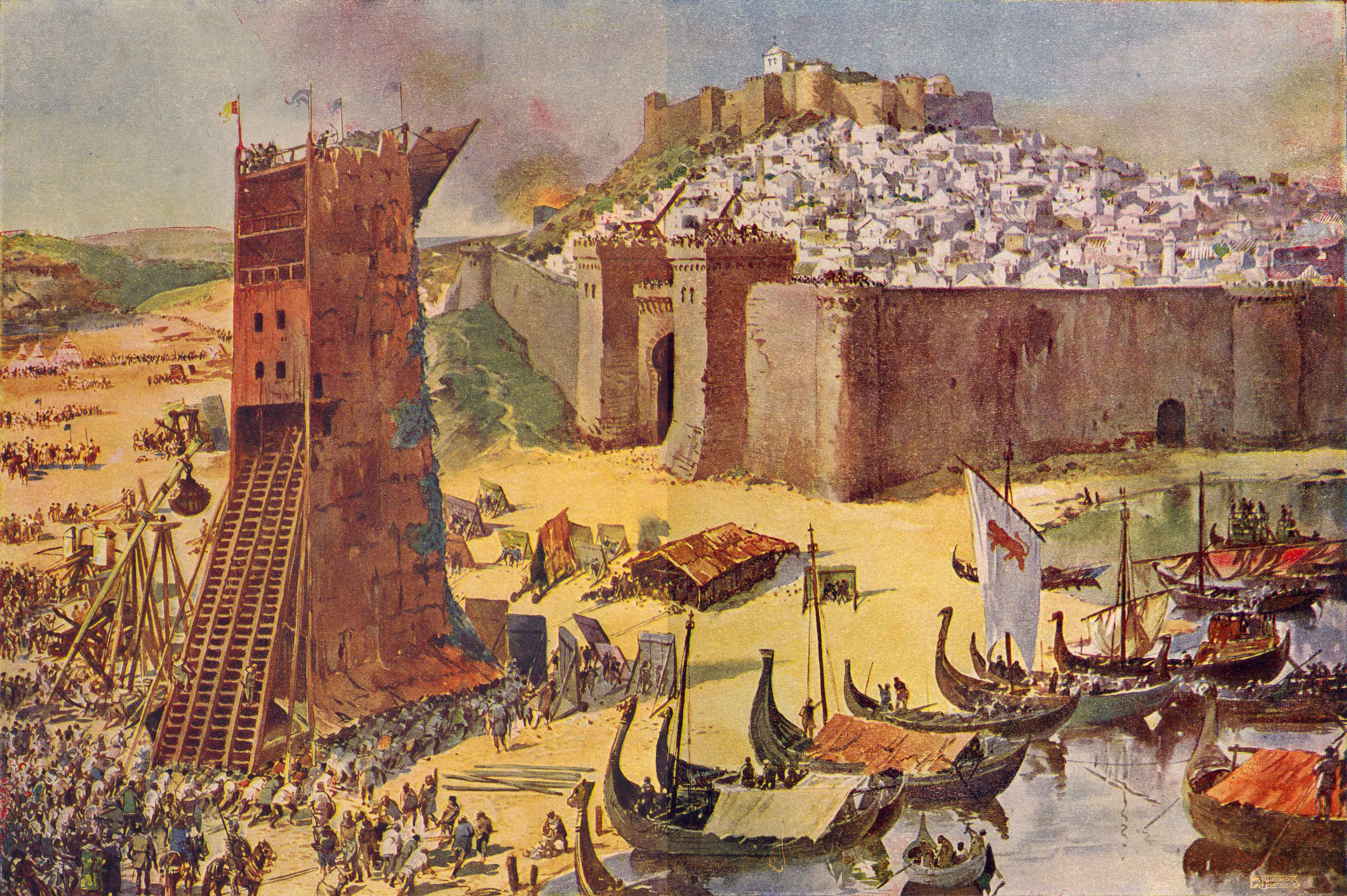
- The Conquest of Lisbon painting by Alfredo Roque Gameiro (1917)
Date	1 July – 25 October 1147
Location	Lisbon, Portugal 38°42′50″N 9°8′0″W
Result	Portuguese-Crusader victory

Belligerents
Portugal; Crusaders	Almoravid dynasty

Commanders and leaders
Afonso I of Portugal; Hervey de Glanvill; Arnout IV, Count of Aarschot; Christian of Ghistelles; Simon of Dover; Andrew of London; Saher of Archelle; William Longsword	Muhammad ibn Hakam

Strength
20,000; 7,400 Portuguese; 6,400 English and Normans; 5,400 Germans; 2,400 Flemings and French	~15,000

The siege of Lisbon, from 1 July to 25 October 1147, was the military action against the Almoravid dynasty that brought the city of Lisbon under the definitive control of the new Christian power, the Kingdom of Portugal. It is seen as a pivotal battle of the wider Reconquista.

The siege of Lisbon was one of the few Christian victories of the Second Crusade—it was "the only success of the universal operation undertaken by the pilgrim army", i.e., the Second Crusade, according to the near contemporary historian Helmold, although others have questioned whether it was really part of that crusade. The fall of Edessa in 1144 (present day Sanliurfa, Turkey) led to a call for a new crusade by Pope Eugene III in 1145 and 1146. In the spring of 1147, the Pope authorized the crusade in the Iberian Peninsula. He also authorized Alfonso VII of León and Castile to equate his campaigns against the Moors with the rest of the Second Crusade. In May 1147, a contingent of crusaders left from Dartmouth, Devon in the Kingdom of England. They had intended to sail directly to the Holy Land, but weather forced the ships to stop on the Portuguese coast at the northern city of Porto on 16 June 1147. There they were convinced to meet with Afonso I of Portugal, who had in 1139 declared himself king of the new Kingdom of Portugal.

The crusaders agreed to help the King attack Lisbon, with a solemn agreement that offered to the crusaders the pillage of the city's goods and the ransom money for expected prisoners. The siege began on 1 July. The city of Lisbon at the time of arrival consisted of 60,000 families, including the refugees who had fled Christian onslaught from neighbouring cities of Santarém and others. Also reported by the De expugnatione Lyxbonensi is that the citadel was holding 154,000 men, not counting women and children; as the medieval account put it, after 17 weeks of siege "the inhabitants were despoiled and the city cleansed".

The rulers of Lisbon agreed to surrender on 24 October, four months later, primarily because of hunger within the city. Most of the crusaders settled in the newly captured city, but some of the crusaders set sail and continued to the Holy Land. Lisbon eventually became the capital city of the Kingdom of Portugal in 1255.

== Second Crusade ==
The traditional start of the Reconquista is identified with the defeat of the Muslims in the Battle of Covadonga in 722. After the First Crusade in 1095–1099, Pope Paschal II urged Iberian crusaders (Portuguese, Castilians, Leonese, Aragonese, and others) to remain at home, where their own warfare was considered just as worthy as that of crusaders travelling to Jerusalem.

During the siege of Lisbon in 1142, Afonso Henriques, taking advantage of the passage of a group of Anglo-Norman crusaders on their way to the Holy Land, attempted to use them to take the Muslim-ruled city of Lisbon. Although this attempt ultimately failed, leaving some distrust among the crusader forces, it showed the Portuguese monarch the usefulness of such force in future attempts.

The fall of Edessa in 1144 led to a call for a new crusade by Pope Eugene III in 1145 and 1146. In the spring of 1147, the Pope also authorized a crusade in the Iberian Peninsula, where "the war against the Moors had been going on for hundreds of years." Pope Eugene encouraged Marseille, Pisa, Genoa, and other Mediterranean cities to fight in Iberia. He also authorized Alfonso VII of León and Castile to equate his campaigns against the Moors with the rest of the Second Crusade.

On 19 May 1147, a contingent of crusaders left from Dartmouth in England, consisting of crusaders from Flanders, Frisia, France, England, Scotland and some German polities who collectively considered themselves "Franks". No prince or king was in charge of the expedition, and its participants seem to have been largely made up of townsmen, who organised themselves using a sworn oath. Leadership was provided by Hervey de Glanvill, Constable of Suffolk. Other crusader captains included Arnout IV, Count of Aarschot leading the Rhinelanders, Christian de Ghistelles leading the Flemish and French forces from the County of Boulogne, and the Anglo-Norman forces led by Simon of Dover, Andrew of London, and Saher of Archelle. Important decisions were made collectively by the commanders.

=== Redirected efforts ===
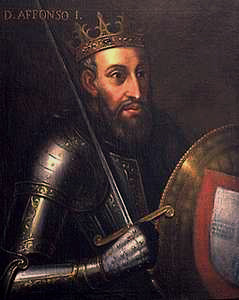
Afonso I of Portugal in a non-contemporary portrait

According to Odo of Deuil there were 164 ships bound for the Holy Land, and there may have been as many as 200 by the time they reached the Iberian shore. Bad weather forced the ships to stop on the Portuguese coast, at the northern city of Porto on 16 June 1147. There they were convinced by the bishop of Porto, Pedro II Pitões, to meet with King Afonso. The king, who had reached the Tagus and conquered Santarém on 15 March, had also been negotiating with the pope for the recognition of his title of King. He was notified of the arrival of a first party and hastened to meet them.

The undisciplined multi-national group agreed to help him there, with a solemn agreement that offered to the crusaders the pillage of the city's goods and the ransom money for expected prisoners. For the city, "they shall have it and hold it until it has been searched and despoiled, both of prisoners for ransom and of everything else. Then, when it has been as thoroughly searched as they wish, they shall turn it over to me..."

King Afonso promised to divide the conquered territories as fiefs among the leaders. He reserved the power of advocatus and released those who were at the siege and their heirs trading in Portugal from the commercial tax called the pedicata.

The English crusaders were at first unenthusiastic at this change of plan, but Hervey de Glanville convinced them to participate. However, some, led by William Viel and his brother, refused to take part on account of the failed joint attempt to capture Lisbon in 1142. Hostages were exchanged as sureties for the oaths.

=== Fall of Lisbon ===
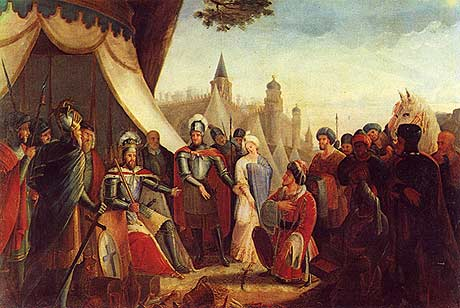
The Siege of Lisbon by D. Afonso Henriques by Joaquim Rodrigues Braga (1840): a Romantic view

The siege began on 1 July. The Christians soon captured the surrounding territories and besieged the walls of Lisbon itself. After four months, the rulers agreed to surrender on 21 October because the Crusaders' siege tower reached their wall (thus causing a one-day standstill) and because of hunger within the city, which was sheltering populations displaced from Santarém, as well as "the leading citizens of Sintra, Almada, and Palmela."

After a brief riotous insurrection, which the Anglo-Norman chronicler attributes to "the men of Cologne and the Flemings", the city was entered by the Christian conquerors, on 25 October. The terms of the surrender indicated that the Muslim garrison of the city would be allowed to keep their lives and property, but as soon as the Christians entered the city these terms were broken. According to the De expugnatione Lyxbonensi,

The enemy, when they had been despoiled in the city, left the town through three gates continuously from Saturday morning until the following Wednesday. There was such a multitude of people that it seemed as if all of Hispania were mingled in the crowd.

Furthermore, according to the De expugnatione Lyxbonensi, the Flemish and those from Cologne were the ones who broke their oath, but even according to this they were more concerned with plundering than killing any of the inhabitants:

They ran hither and yon. They plundered. They broke down doors. They rummaged through the interior of every house. They drove the citizens away and harassed them improperly and unjustly. They destroyed clothes and utensils. They treated virgins shamefully. They acted as if right and wrong were the same. They secretly took away everything which should have been common property. They even cut the throat of the elderly Bishop of the city, slaying him against all right and justice. … The Normans and the English, however, for whom faith and religion were of the greatest importance, contemplating what such actions might lead to, remained quietly in their assigned position, preferring to stay their hands from looting rather than to violate the obligations of their faith and their oathbound association.

== Aftermath ==
Some of the crusaders set sail and continued on their journey around the Iberian Peninsula and were invited by Count Ramon Berenguer IV of Barcelona to help him capture the city of Tortosa on the Ebro. However, most of the crusaders settled in the newly captured city, thus boosting the number of Christian supporters in Iberia.

Gilbert of Hastings was elected bishop, marking the beginning of the historic relationship between England and Portugal which would later form the Anglo-Portuguese Alliance.

In spite of the contractual nature of the city's surrender, a legend arose that the Portuguese warrior and nobleman, Martim Moniz, sacrificed himself in order to keep the city doors open to the conquering Christian armies.

Lisbon eventually became the capital city of the Kingdom of Portugal in 1255. The victory was a turning-point in the history of Portugal and the wider Reconquista, which would be completed in 1492.

== See also ==
- São Jorge Castle
- Portugal in the Middle Ages
- Timeline of Portuguese history
- De expugnatione Lyxbonensi, a contemporary eye-witness account.
- The History of the Siege of Lisbon, a modern novel about the siege and of the unreliability of historical memory.

== Sources ==
- L. Wheeler, C. Opello, Douglas, Walter (2010). Historical Dictionary of Portugal. Scarecrow Press. ISBN 978-0-8108-6088-9.
- Runciman, Steven (1952). A History of the Crusades, vol. II: The Kingdom of Jerusalem and the Frankish East, 1100–1187. New York: Cambridge University Press.
- Brundage, James (1962). The Crusades: A Documentary History. Milwaukee, Wisconsin: Marquette University Press.
- Riley-Smith, Jonathan (1990). The Atlas of the Crusades. New York: Facts on File. ISBN 978-0-8160-2186-4.
- Phillips, Jonathan (2007). The Second Crusade: Extending the Frontiers of Christendom. New Haven, Connecticut: Yale University Press. ISBN 978-0-300-11274-0.
- Villegas-Aristizábal, Lucas, "Norman and Anglo-Norman Participation in the Iberian Reconquista", Ph.D Thesis, Nottingham, 2007, pp. 146–85.
- Villegas-Aristizábal, Lucas, "Revisiting the Anglo-Norman Crusaders' Failed Attempt to Conquer Lisbon c. 1142", Portuguese Studies 29:1 (2013), pp. 7–20.
- West, Charles (2013), "All in the same boat? East Anglia, the North Sea world and the 1147 expedition to Lisbon", in D. Bates and R. Liddiard (eds.) East Anglia and its North Sea World in the Middle Ages, pp. 287–300, ISBN 9781843838463
