= Onno Hattinga van't Sant =

Onno Willem Cornelis Hattinga van't Sant
- Born: 3 May 1946 (age 78); The Hague
- Occupation: Diplomat

Onno Willem Cornelis Hattinga van't Sant (born 3 May 1946) is a Dutch diplomat. He is the current Ambassador of the Kingdom of the Netherlands in Brazil.

== Education ==
Mr. Onno Hattinga van't Sant, born in The Hague, studied at the Leiden University and has a Master of Law degree.

== Diplomatic career ==
In 1972, he joined the Ministry of Foreign Affairs and worked in various roles at the Dutch Embassies in Moscow, Jakarta, Lisbon, the Netherlands Permanent Representation to the United Nations in New York and the Department of International Bodies of the Ministry of Foreign Affairs. In The Hague where he remained until 1987.

After this date, for 5 years, he was a Counselor in the Permanent Representation to the European Community in Brussels. From 1992 until 1997, he was a Deputy Counselor and Head of the Department of Europe at the Ministry of Foreign Affairs in The Hague. In 1997, he was Ambassador Extraordinary and Plenipotentiary of the Kingdom of the Netherlands to Ukraine, Moldova, Armenia and Georgia, residing in Kyiv, Ukraine. He remained until 2001. From 2001-2005 he was Deputy Permanent Representative of the Netherlands to NATO in Brussels. From 2005-2009 he took over as Ambassador Extraordinary and Plenipotentiary of the Kingdom of the Netherlands in Brazil. From 2009 - 2011 traveling ambassador for the Eastern neighbors of the European Union. Retired since 1 May 2011
