= Álvaro de Vasconcelos =

Portuguese politician

Álvaro Manuel Ribeiro Garcia de Vasconcelos
- Born: 1944 (age 81–82); Porto, Portugal

Álvaro de Vasconcelos was the Director of the European Union Institute for Security Studies between May 2007 and May 2012.

== Career ==
Prior to this, he headed the Institute of Strategic and International Studies (IEEI) in Lisbon, of which he is a co-founder, from 1980 to 2007 where he launched several networks including the Euro-Latin American Forum and EuroMeSCo.

Most of his work, as well as papers, photographs and other forms of archive regarding the IEEI's body of work and events (such as the Euro-Latin American Conference or the Lisbon Conferences) is freely available for public consultation at CD-IEEI or at IMDN. This Documentation Centre contains most of the documents mentioned below as well as other 3000 documents in Portuguese, English, French and Spanish, on the following topics:

- Portugal's adherence to the European Union and European Policy
- International Order and Multilateralism
- Cooperation Policy
- Mediterranean Policy
- Integration processes
- Portugal's relationship with Brazil
- Portugal's relationship with Spain
- Portugal's relationship with the USA
- Portugal's relationship with its former African colonies (Cape Verde, Guinea-Bissau, São Tomé and Princípe, Angola and Mozambique), East Timor and Macau
- Political and Military Relationships
- Security and Defense
- Democratic Transitions

As well as being a regular columnist in the Portuguese and international press, he is author and co-editor of many books, articles and reports, notably in the areas of the EU's Common Foreign and Security Policy (CFSP), Euro-Mediterranean relations and on the theme of world order, such as Portugal: A European Story, La PESC: Ouvrir l'Europe au Monde, The European Union, Mercosul and the New World Order, and A European Strategy for the Mediterranean.

In 2016, he founded the International think tank Forum Demos.

== Personal life ==
Álvaro de Vasconcelos is a Knight of the French Legion of Honor and a Comendador do Ordem do Rio Branco (Brazil). He was married to the late Maria do Rosário de Moraes Vaz, Director of Programmes at the IEEI, Lisbon. He was first married to a Frenchwoman, Brigitte Courot with whom he had one daughter. With Rosário de Moraes Vaz he had two daughters.

== List of publications ==
=== EUISS publications ===
==== Chaillot Papers ====
- Global security in a multipolar world, introduction by Álvaro de Vasconcelos, Chaillot Paper 118, October 2009
- “Multilateralising” multipolarity, in ‘Partnerships for effective multilateralism’, Chaillot Paper 109, EUISS, June 2008
- The EU and Iraq, in ‘Looking into Iraq’, Chaillot Paper 79, EUISS, July 2005
- The war on terrorism, in ‘One Year On: Lessons from Iraq’, Chaillot Paper 68, EUISS, March 2004

==== Reports ====
- The European Strategy and Policy Analysis System (ESPAS) 'Global Trends 2030 - Citizens in a Polycentric World', ESPAS Report, March 2012 (Editor)
- What do Europeans want from NATO?, EUISS Report n° 8, November 2010 (coordinator)
- A strategy for EU foreign policy, EUISS Report n° 7, June 2010 (edited and co-author)
- The European Security Strategy 2003-2008 – Building on Common Interests, EUISS Report n° 5, February 2009 (edited and co-author)
- The EU and the world in 2009, in European perspectives on the new American foreign policy agenda, EUISS Report n° 4, January 2009 (edited and co-author)
- Union pour la Méditerranée: le potentiel de l’acquis de Barcelone, EUISS Report nº 3, November 2008 (co-author)
- Union for the Mediterranean – Building on the Barcelona acquis, EUISS Report nº 1, May 2008 (co-author)

==== Books ====
- Quelle défense européenne en 2020? EUISS Book, juillet 2010 (French translation of 2009 book "What ambitions for European defence in 2020?")
- The Obama Moment – European and American perspectives, EUISS Book, November 2009
- What ambitions for European defence in 2020? EUISS Book, first edition July 2009 and second revised edition October 2009

=== Other publications ===
==== Articles and Papers ====
Articles in specialised journals, and major project reports

- "What ambition for European defence?" ESDP Newsletter, Special issue, October 2009
- "L’Union européenne parmi les grandes puissances," Commentaire, Volume 31/nº 124, Hiver 2008-2009
- "Entender la seguridad de otro modo: una salida al impasse del proceso de Barcelona" in Eduard Soler i Lecha y Laia Carbonell Agustín (eds.), VI Seminario Internacional sobre Seguridad y Defensa en el Mediterráneo. La seguridad humana, Fundació CIDOB, December 2008
- “El día después de la cumbre”, Akfar/Ideas, nº 19, Fall 2008
- "Security for Africans," ESDP newsletter nº 5, December 2007
- "An Open Europe in a Multipolar World: Lessons from the Portuguese Experience," Notre Europe, Studies and Research 60, October 2007 (translated into French and Portuguese)
- "Looking South," The Parliament Magazine, Issue 249, 2 July 2007
- "Una Europa Mundo," El Pais, March 2007
- Research priorities beyond the fog of culturalism, Challenges for Policy-oriented Research on the Middle East, SWP, March 2007
- "A Europa sem Fronteiras," Janus 2007, UAL & Jornal Público, 2007
- "Getting it Right: Inclusion within Diversity – Lessons of the ‘Cartoons Crisis’ and beyond," EuroMeSCo Report, 2006 (mimeo).
- ‘“Great Pond” Europeanization ?, La revue internationale et stratégique n° 61, IRIS, Spring 2006,
- Reform-minded Portugal unsure over EU's value, Europe's World, nº 3, Summer 2006
- Barcelona 2005: la cuestión democrática entra en escena, Anuario del Mediterraneo. Barcelona: IEMed./CIDOB, 2006.
- A Arte da Paz, Relações Internacionais, 8, Lisbon: IPRI, December 2005
- Democratic Security Ten Years On, Ten years of the Barcelona Process: results and new aims, CIDOB, 2005
- A Dialogue of Civilization or “Inclusion within Diversity?” Eurofuture, Winter 2005
- Os Caminhos do Multilateralismo activo, Second International Conference of Forte Copacabana, October, 2005
- A Europa e um Novo Mandato de Bush: O Triunfo de Vénus, Política Externa, Vol. 14, nº 1, São Paulo: Paz&Terra, June–July–August 2005
- L’européanisation, la voie à prendre ?, ‘Les fondements des politiques étrangères des États européens’, La revue internationale et stratégique, nº61, IRIS, printemps, 2006
- Europe and Reform: Barcelona Now More than Ever, Arab Reform Bulletin, Vol. 3, Issue 3, April, 2005
- Barcelona Plus. Towards a Euro-Mediterranean Community of Democratic States, EuroMeSCo Report, IEEI, April 2005.
- A Hipóteses Europeia, Relações Internacionais, nº3, September 2004
- Os Estados Unidos no futuro da Europa, Janus, UAL & Jornal Público, 2004
- The EU and the Mediterranean Overhauling the Status Quo Policy, The International Spectator, Vol. XXXVIII (3), July–September 2003
- The future of EMP, September 11 and the Future of the Euro-Mediterranean Cooperation, Carlo Masala, Edts., ZEI Discussion Paper, 2003
- A Crise Europeia e a Ordem Mundial, Política Externa, Vol. 12, June–July–August, 2003
- Perejil/Leila: Lessons for Europe, Piece for the Real Instituto Elcano website, 19 July 2002
- A OSCE: Uma Peça no Processo de Inclusão Europeia, Instituto de Defesa Nacional, nº103, Autumn-Winter 2002
- Europe's Mediterranean Strategy. An asymmetric equation, presented at The Convergence of Civilizations? Constructing a Mediterranean Region Conference, 6–9 June, Convent, Portugal (organised by University of California at Berkeley)
- Seven Points on the Euro-Mediterranean Partnership, The International Spectator, 37, 2002

==== Books: Chapters in Collective Volumes ====
- "The European Union and Mercosul", in Mário Telò (coord.), European Union and New Regionalism: Regional Actors and Global Governance in a Post-hegemonic Era. Revised edition. Burlington, Vermont: Ashgate, September 2007.
- "Conversas com Embaixador José Calvet de Magalhães" in Europeístas e Isolacionistas na Política Externa Portuguesa, Álvaro de Vasconcelos (Eds), Bizâncio, Lisbon, 2005
- "Back to the future? Reviving Multilateralism," in Alfredo G. A. Valladão, Pedro da Motta Veiga (eds.), Political Issues in the EU-Mercosur Negotiations, Chaire Mercosur de Sciences Po, 2003.
- "L’Union européenne et la régionalisation du système international," in Mélanges en hommage à Jean-Victor Louis, Vol. I. Bruxelles: ULB, 2003.
- "The European Crisis and the World Order," in Hélio Jaguaribe and Álvaro de Vasconcelos (eds.), The European Union, Mercosul and the New World Order. Frank Cass, 2003.
- "European Foreign and Security Policy and Latin America," in Paolo Giordano (ed.), An Integrated Approach to the EU-Mercosur Association, Paris: Chaire Mercosur de Sciences Po, 2002.

==== Project Syndicate ====
- Bush's dying days in Gaza, January 2009
- Hamas's Ghost in Annapolis, November 2007
- The “War on Democratization”, July 2007
- The Islamic Democratic Paradox, February 2006
- Fighting Terrorism Democratically, 2005
- What Now? More Europe!, 2005
- Kerry vs. Bush: Will Reason Prevail?, October 2004
- Terror Or Reform In The Greater Middle East, March 2004

==== Portuguese Journals ====
- O fim do carácter único da Europa?, Público, 21 January 2009
- O efeito Obama, Público, November 2008
- Na morte de um fazedor da Europa democrática, Público, July 2008
- Mais e melhor Europa, Público, July 2008
- Uma força europeia, para quê?, Público, August 2006
- Dilema Islamita, Público, 16 February 2006
- A América sem Alianças, Expresso, August 2004
- Condições sine qua non de um plano Europeu, Expresso, May 2004
- O preço a pagar, Expresso, October 2003
- Pela Espanha!, Expresso, November 2003
- O comboio da Europa, in Público, November 2003
- Três mundos possíveis, in Expresso, June 2003
- O Medo Português, in Público, December 2002
- Europa sem Fronteiras, in Expresso, December 2002
- O Efeito Lula, in Expresso, December 2002

==== IEEI Publications ====
- O Mediterrâneo no centro da política mundial. Diálogo de civilizações ou «inclusão na diversidade»?, Estratégia Nº21, Bizâncio, 1º Semestre 2005
- Desenvolvimento e Parcerias. Integração aberta e cidadania, Estratégia Nº20, Principia, 1º Semestre 2004
- A Europa como actor internacional. Uma Federação às Avessas, Estratégia Nº18-19, Principia, 1º/2º Semestres 2003
- Um facto político, Estratégia Nº17, Principia, 2º Semestre 2002
- A União Europeia e a Ordem Internacional, Estratégia Nº16, Principia, 1º Semestre 2002 O Mundo em Português
- O ano do Euro: ano da Europa?, O Mundo em Português Nº 28, Principia, January 2002
- Os Direitos do Inimigo, Nº 29, O Mundo em Português Principia, February 2002
- Manobras de Guerra e de Paz, O Mundo em Português Nº 30, Principia, March 2002
- A Intervenção Que Falta, O Mundo em Português Nº 31, Principia, April 2002
- A Fantástica Aventura, O Mundo em Português Nº 32, Principia, May 2002
- A identidade post-nacional de Timor, O Mundo em Português Nº 33, Principia, June 2002
- Viver com os outros, O Mundo em Português Nº 34/35, Principia, July/August 2002
- A desordem imperial, O Mundo em Português Nº 36, Principia, September 2002
- Intervenções urgentes, O Mundo em Português Nº 37, Principia, October 2002
- Democracia tranquila, O Mundo em Português Nº 38, Principia, November 2002
- A questão Turca, O Mundo em Português Nº 39, Principia, December 2002
- 3 votos para um ano decisivo, O Mundo em Português Nº 40, Principia, January 2003
- O Iraque no futuro da Europa, O Mundo em Português Nº 41, Principia, February 2003
- O Mundo que a Europa quer, O Mundo em Português Nº 42, Principia, March 2003
- Vencer a paz, O Mundo em Português Nº 43, Principia, April 2003
- Paradoxo democrático, O Mundo em Português Nº 44, Principia, May 2003
- A Europa Mundo, O Mundo em Português Nº 45-47, Principia, June–July–August 2003
- Império impossível, ordem improvável, O Mundo em Português Nº 45-47, Principia, September 2003
- Os três Mundos, O Mundo em Português Nº 49, Principia, October 2003
- Península da Europa, O Mundo em Português Nº 50, Principia, November 2003
- Portugal, a defesa e o mundo, O Mundo em Português Nº 51-52, Principia, December 2003/January 2004
- Odisseias, O Mundo em Português Nº 53, Principia, February 2004
- A Europa e o Grande Médio Oriente, O Mundo em Português Nº 54, Principia, March 2004
- O 25 de Abril no tempo que corre, O Mundo em Português Nº 55, Principia, April/May 2004
- Os trabalhos da União, O Mundo em Português Nº 56, Principia, September/October 2004
- O dia seguinte, O Mundo em Português Nº 57, Principia, September/October 2004
- A Europa global, O Mundo em Português Nº 58, IEEI, April/May 2005
- Democracia e Terrorismo, O Mundo em Português Nº 59, IEEI, August/September 2005
- A redescoberta do Mundo, O Mundo em Português Nº 60, IEEI, December 2005
- A Ignorância Perigosa, O Mundo em Português Nº 61, IEEI, February/March 2006
- Timor: a quem interessa?, O Mundo em Português Nº 62, IEEI; June/July 2006
- O fracasso do unilateralismo armado, O Mundo em Português Nº 63, IEEI, October/November 2006
