= De expugnatione Lyxbonensi =

Eyewitness account of the Siege of Lisbon

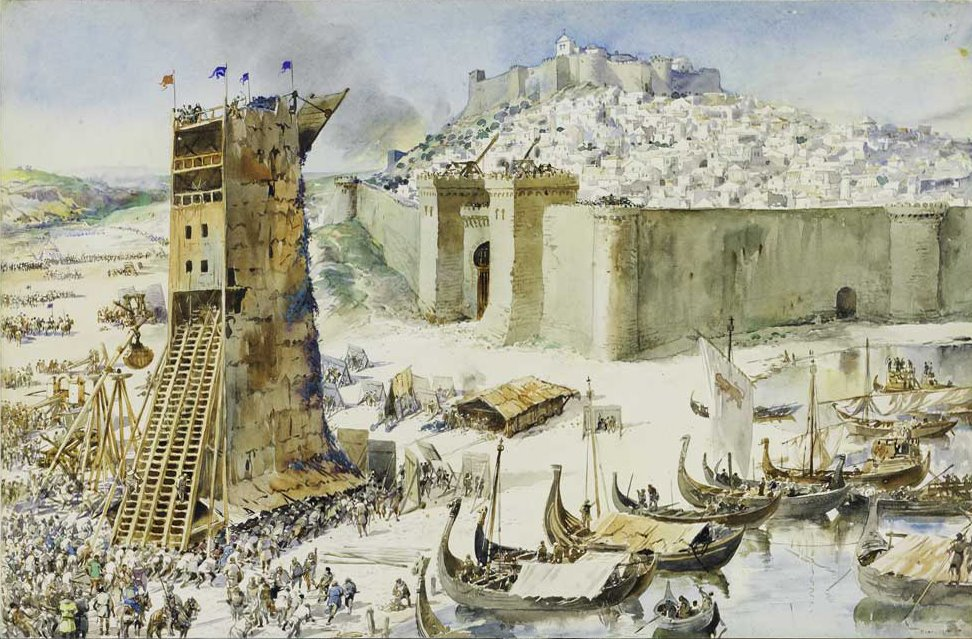
The siege as imagined by Alfredo Roque Gameiro (1917) based on the Expugnatione and showing the siege tower and the "Welsh cat". This is the mobile covered shelter between the tower and the city walls, used to protect sappers trying to undermine the walls.

De expugnatione Lyxbonensi ('On the Conquest of Lisbon') is an eyewitness account of the Siege of Lisbon at the start of the Second Crusade, and covers the expedition from the departure of the English contingent on 23 May 1147 until the fall of Lisbon on 28 June 1148. It was written in Latin by one Raol, an Anglo-Fleming and probably a chaplain of Hervey de Glanvill in the army from East Anglia. It is an important source for the organisation of the crusade, especially among the middle ranks of society. An English translation by Charles Wendell David appeared in 1936 and was reprinted in 2001.

== Manuscript ==
De expugnatione is untitled in its sole manuscript. Its first English editor, William Stubbs, gave it its modern title, which was picked up by Charles Wendell David, who preferred it for its similarity to the titles used by the Lisbon Academy, by Reinhold Pauli for his German edition of some excerpts, and in the bibliographies of August Potthast and Auguste Molinier. Charles Purton Cooper, in recognition of the text's form as an epistle, designates it Cruce Signati anglici Epistola de expugnatione Ulisiponis ("English Crusaders' Letter on the Conquest of Lisbon").

The unique manuscript was believed by Stubbs and Pauli to be the original autograph. David suggests however that it was not the original, which was probably written hastily during the crusade, but rather a later autograph edited by the author later, perhaps in his old age.

The manuscript is located in the Parker Library of Corpus Christi College, Cambridge, Manuscript 470, fol. 125-146.

== Authorship ==
The author of the De expugnatione names himself in his opening lines, although in an obscure abbreviated form that has perplexed scholars: Osb. de Baldr. R. salutem. Since at least the time of Archbishop Matthew Parker he has been known as "Osbern" and the manuscript's table of contents, written in a Renaissance hand, lists the work as Historia Osberni de Expeditione etc. ("Osbern's History of the Expedition, etc."). This purely conjectural name has been oft repeated and has become traditional.

Ulrich Cosack, in his doctoral dissertation, argued that "Osbern" was an Anglo-Norman on the grounds that he showed a marked preference for narrating their deeds. Pauli argued the same on the grounds that he used gallicisms, like garciones ("men"), but he also used anglicisms, like worma. He probably hailed from the east of England, for the men of Suffolk appear frequently in his account, such as the seven youths of Ipswich who defended the siege tower using the protection of a mobile siege engine called the "Welsh cat".

== Speeches ==
De expugnatione contains three speeches about crusading, from the mouths of three (probably deliberately) different men: Pedro Pitões, Bishop of Porto, Hervey de Glanvill and an anonymous "certain priest", possibly Raol himself. They are not "verbatim reports [but] more or less formal reconstructions". The bishop, who persuaded the crusaders to turn aside and attack Lisbon, had seen his own cathedral of Santa Maria plundered by the Muslims in 1140, when they took off with some liturgical vestments and killed and enslaved members of his clergy. To incite them to his aid, Pedro called the crusaders "God's people", who were on "a blessed pilgrimage", and told them that "[t]he praiseworthy thing is not to have been to Jerusalem but to have lived a good life while on the way". His pleading lacks confidence, suggesting ethical uncertainty, and his sermon, based on Augustine, Isidore and Ivo of Chartres, is dry, but his use of the crusade for an attack on Lisbon suggests that concept was still flexible and could be detached from the pilgrimage to Jerusalem at that point in time. In his effort to soothe the crusaders' consciences, he urged them to "act like good soldiers" and affirmed that "[s]in is not in waging war but in waging war for the sake of plunder" and "[w]hen a war had been entered upon by God's will it is not permitted to doubt that it has been rightly undertaken". The bishop ultimately offered to pay the crusaders for their assistance, and did so with plunder from the successful siege.

Hervey's speech appeals to family pride, the desire for glory, "the counsels of honour" and the unity to which the crusaders had sworn at the onset of the expedition. The priest, after reminding the soldiers that the Muslims had desecrated a cross "with the filth of their posteriors", held up a relic of the True Cross and reduced the host to tears before assuring them that "in this sign, if you do not hesitate, you will conquer. . . [for] if it should happen that anyone signed with this cross should die, we do not believe that life has been taken from him, for we have no doubt that he is changed into something better". He ended with a line he probably got from a letter written by Bernard de Clairvaux to the English crusaders in 1146: "Here, therefore, to live is glory and to die is gain". After the priest's sermon many of those present renewed their vows, and presumably some who had not yet done so were inaugurated into the ranks of the crucesignati (cross-signed). The influence of Bernard on both the bishop and the priest is evident.
