= April 30 =

April 30 this year in various calendars
- Thursday, 30 April 2026
Akan	Nwonayaw
Armenian	14 Mareri 1475
Aztec	Xocotlhuetzi 10, 7 Tecpatl
Babylonian	12 Nisanu, 2337 SE
Balinese pawukon	Luang, Pepet, Beteng, Laba, Paing, Aryang, Wraspati of Kulantir, Indra, Ogan, Raja
Bengali	17 Boisakh, BS 1433
Chinese	Yang Wood Dog・Horn Mansion; Fire Horse Year, Month 3, Day 14 (Guyu, 5 days until Lixia)
Common Era	30 April 2026 CE
Coptic	22 Parmouti, AM 1742
Egyptian	14 Thoth, 2775 NE
Ethiopian	22 Miyāzyā, 2018 Amätä Məhrät
French Republican	Décade II, Primidi de Floréal de l'Année 234 de la République
Gregorian	30 April, AD 2026
Hebrew	13 Iyar, AM 5786; Omer 28
Hindu	Citrā・Vajra; Solar: 17 Vaiśākha, 1948 SE; Lunisolar: Caturdaśī, Śukla pakṣa of Vaiśākha, 2083 VE; Rāudra・5127 KY・1,872,695
Icelandic	Fimmtudagur, 8 Harpa 2026
Islamic	13 Dhu al-Qi'dah, AH 1447 (using tabular method)
ISO week date	2026-W18-4
Japanese	14 Yayoi, Reiwa 8 (Kokuu, 5 days until Rikka)
Julian	17 April, AD 2026 (AM 7534)
Julian day	2461161
Korean	14 Yongdal, 4359 DE
Maya	13.0.13.9.18; 11 Uo, 7 Etznab
Roman	ante diem XV Kalendas Maias, MMDCCLXXIX AUC
Solar Hijri	10 Ordibehesht, SH 1405
Tibetan	14 nag pa, me pho rta 2153 or 1772 or 1000

<<	April					>>
Su	Mo	Tu	We	Th	Fr	Sa
			1	2	3	4
5	6	7	8	9	10	11
12	13	14	15	16	17	18
19	20	21	22	23	24	25
26	27	28	29	30
2026

April 30 in recent years
2026 (Thursday)
2025 (Wednesday)
2024 (Tuesday)
2023 (Sunday)
2022 (Saturday)
2021 (Friday)
2020 (Thursday)
2019 (Tuesday)
2018 (Monday)
2017 (Sunday)

April 30 is the 120th day of the year (121st in leap years) in the Gregorian calendar; 245 days remain until the end of the year.

== Events ==
=== Pre-1600 ===
- 311 – The Diocletianic Persecution of Christians in the Roman Empire ends.
- 1305 – Roger de Flor, leader of the mercenary Catalan Company, is murdered, leading to widespread pillaging by the mercenaries in Thrace.
- 1315 – Enguerrand de Marigny is hanged at the instigation of Charles, Count of Valois.
- 1492 – Spain gives Christopher Columbus his commission of exploration. He is named admiral of the ocean sea, viceroy and governor of any territory he discovers.
- 1513 – Edmund de la Pole, Yorkist pretender to the English throne, is executed on the orders of Henry VIII.
- 1598 – Juan de Oñate begins the conquest of Santa Fe de Nuevo México.
- 1598 – Henry IV of France issues the Edict of Nantes, allowing freedom of religion to the Huguenots.

=== 1601–1900 ===
- 1636 – Eighty Years' War: Dutch Republic forces recapture a strategically important fort from Spain after a nine-month siege.
- 1789 – On the balcony of Federal Hall on Wall Street in New York City, George Washington takes the oath of office to become the first President of the United States.
- 1803 – Louisiana Purchase: The United States purchases the Louisiana Territory from France for $15 million, more than doubling the size of the young nation.
- 1812 – The Territory of Orleans becomes the 18th U.S. state under the name Louisiana.
- 1838 – Nicaragua declares independence from the Central American Federation.
- 1859 – Charles Dickens publishes the first edition of his literary magazine, All the Year Round, containing the first installment of his best-selling classic, A Tale of Two Cities.
- 1863 – A 65-man French Foreign Legion infantry patrol fights a force of nearly 2,000 Mexican soldiers to nearly the last man in Hacienda Camarón, Mexico.
- 1864 – American Civil War: Confederate forces led by General E. Kirby Smith attack federal troops retreating across the Saline at Jenkins' Ferry, Arkansas.
- 1871 – The Camp Grant massacre takes place in Arizona Territory.
- 1885 – Governor of New York David B. Hill signs legislation creating the Niagara Reservation, New York's first state park, ensuring that Niagara Falls will not be devoted solely to industrial and commercial use.
- 1897 – J. J. Thomson of the Cavendish Laboratory announces his discovery of the electron as a subatomic particle, over 1,800 times smaller than a proton (in the atomic nucleus), at a lecture at the Royal Institution in London.
- 1900 – Hawaii becomes a territory of the United States, with Sanford B. Dole as governor.

=== 1901–present ===
- 1905 – Albert Einstein completes his doctoral thesis at the University of Zurich.
- 1925 – Automaker Dodge Brothers, Inc, is sold to Dillon, Read & Co. for US$146 million plus $50 million for charity.
- 1927 – The Federal Industrial Institute for Women opens in Alderson, West Virginia, as the first women's federal prison in the United States.
- 1937 – The Commonwealth of the Philippines holds a plebiscite for Filipino women on whether they should be extended the right to suffrage; over 90% would vote in the affirmative.
- 1939 – The 1939–40 New York World's Fair opens.
- 1939 – NBC inaugurates its regularly scheduled television service in New York City, broadcasting President Franklin D. Roosevelt's N.Y. World's Fair opening day ceremonial address.
- 1943 – World War II: The British submarine HMS Seraph surfaces near Huelva to cast adrift a dead man dressed as a courier and carrying false invasion plans.
- 1945 – World War II: Führerbunker: Adolf Hitler and Eva Braun commit suicide after being married for less than 40 hours.
- 1945 - World War II: Soviet soldiers raise the first Soviet flag over the Reichstag. The Victory Banner will be raised the next day.
- 1945 – World War II: Stalag Luft I prisoner-of-war camp near Barth, Germany is liberated by Soviet soldiers, freeing nearly 9,000 American and British airmen.
- 1947 – In Nevada, Boulder Dam is renamed Hoover Dam.
- 1948 – In Bogotá, Colombia, the Organization of American States is established.
- 1956 – Former Vice President and Democratic Senator Alben Barkley dies during a speech in Virginia.
- 1957 – Supplementary Convention on the Abolition of Slavery enters into force.
- 1961 – K-19, the first Soviet nuclear submarine equipped with nuclear missiles, is commissioned.
- 1963 – The Bristol Bus Boycott is held in Bristol to protest the Bristol Omnibus Company's refusal to employ Black or Asian bus crews, drawing national attention to racial discrimination in the United Kingdom.
- 1973 – Watergate scandal: U.S. President Richard Nixon fires White House Counsel John Dean; other top aides, most notably H. R. Haldeman and John Ehrlichman, resign.
- 1975 – Fall of Saigon: Communist forces gain control of Saigon. The Vietnam War formally ends with the unconditional surrender of South Vietnamese president Dương Văn Minh.
- 1979 – Eruption of Mount Marapi: Mount Marapi, a complex volcano on the Indonesian island of Sumatra, erupts. Between 80 and 100 people are killed.
- 1980 – Beatrix is inaugurated as Queen of the Netherlands following the abdication of Juliana.
- 1980 – The Iranian Embassy siege begins in London.
- 1982 – The Bijon Setu massacre occurs in Calcutta, India.
- 1989 – The Monkseaton shootings occur in Tyne and Wear, England. One is killed and 16 are injured.
- 1993 – CERN announces World Wide Web protocols will be free.
- 1994 – Formula One racing driver Roland Ratzenberger is killed in a crash during the qualifying session of the San Marino Grand Prix run at Autodromo Enzo e Dino Ferrari outside Imola, Italy.
- 1999 – Neo-Nazi David Copeland carries out the last of his three nail bombings in London at the Admiral Duncan gay pub, killing three people and injuring 79 others.
- 2000 – Canonization of Faustina Kowalska in the presence of 200,000 people and the first Divine Mercy Sunday celebrated worldwide.
- 2004 – U.S. media release graphic photos of American soldiers committing war crimes against Iraqi prisoners at Abu Ghraib prison.
- 2008 – Two skeletal remains found near Yekaterinburg are confirmed by Russian scientists to be the remains of Alexei and Anastasia, two of the children of the last Tsar of Russia, whose entire family was executed at Yekaterinburg by the Bolsheviks.
- 2009 – Chrysler files for Chapter 11 bankruptcy.
- 2009 – Seven civilians and the perpetrator are killed and another ten injured at a Queen's Day parade in Apeldoorn, Netherlands in an attempted assassination on Queen Beatrix.
- 2012 – An overloaded ferry capsizes on the Brahmaputra River in India killing at least 108 people. At least 150 more are missing and presumed dead.
- 2013 – Willem-Alexander is inaugurated as King of the Netherlands following the abdication of Beatrix.
- 2014 – A bomb blast in Ürümqi, China kills three people and injures 79 others.
- 2021 – Forty-five men and boys are killed in the Meron stampede in Israel.

== Births ==
=== Pre-1600 ===
- 1310 – King Casimir III of Poland (died 1368)
- 1331 – Gaston III, Count of Foix (died 1391)
- 1383 – Anne of Gloucester, English countess, granddaughter of King Edward III of England (died 1438)
- 1425 – William III, Landgrave of Thuringia (died 1482)
- 1504 – Francesco Primaticcio, Italian painter (died 1570)
- 1553 – Louise of Lorraine, Queen of France (died 1601)

=== 1601–1900 ===
- 1623 – François de Laval, French-Canadian bishop and saint (died 1708)
- 1651 – Jean-Baptiste de La Salle, French priest and saint (died 1719)
- 1662 – Mary II, Queen of England and Scotland (died 1694)
- 1664 – François Louis, Prince of Conti (died 1709)
- 1710 – Johann Kaspar Basselet von La Rosée, Bavarian general (died 1795)
- 1723 – Mathurin Jacques Brisson, French zoologist and philosopher (died 1806)
- 1758 – Emmanuel Vitale, Maltese commander and politician (died 1802)
- 1770 – David Thompson, English-Canadian cartographer and explorer (died 1857)
- 1777 – Carl Friedrich Gauss, German mathematician and physicist (died 1855)
- 1799 – Joseph Dart, American businessman and entrepreneur (died 1879)
- 1803 – Albrecht von Roon, Prussian soldier and politician, 10th Minister President of Prussia (died 1879)
- 1829 – Ferdinand von Hochstetter, Austrian geologist and academic (died 1884)
- 1839 – Floriano Peixoto, Brazilian general and politician, 2nd President of Brazil (died 1895)
- 1848 – Eugène Simon, French naturalist (died 1924)
- 1857 – Eugen Bleuler, Swiss psychiatrist and eugenicist (died 1940)
- 1857 – Walter Simon, German banker and philanthropist (died 1920)
- 1865 – Max Nettlau, German historian and academic (died 1944)
- 1866 – Mary Haviland Stilwell Kuesel, American pioneer dentist (died 1936)
- 1869 – Hans Poelzig, German architect, designed the IG Farben Building and Großes Schauspielhaus (died 1936)
- 1870 – Franz Lehár, Hungarian composer (died 1948)
- 1870 – Dadasaheb Phalke, Indian director, producer, and screenwriter (died 1944)
- 1874 – Cyriel Verschaeve, Flemish priest and author (died 1949)
- 1876 – Orso Mario Corbino, Italian physicist and politician (died 1937)
- 1877 – Léon Flameng, French cyclist (died 1917)
- 1877 – Alice B. Toklas, American memoirist (died 1967)
- 1878 – Władysław Witwicki, Polish psychologist, philosopher, translator, historian (of philosophy and art) and artist (died 1948)
- 1879 – Richárd Weisz, Hungarian Olympic champion wrestler (died 1945)
- 1880 – Charles Exeter Devereux Crombie, Scottish cartoonist (died 1967)
- 1883 – Jaroslav Hašek, Czech soldier and author (died 1923)
- 1883 – Luigi Russolo, Italian painter and composer (died 1947)
- 1884 – Olof Sandborg, Swedish actor (died 1965)
- 1888 – John Crowe Ransom, American poet, critic, and academic (died 1974)
- 1893 – Harold Breen, Australian public servant (died 1966)
- 1893 – Joachim von Ribbentrop, German politician, 14th German Reich Minister for Foreign Affairs, executed Nuremberg war criminal (died 1946)
- 1895 – Philippe Panneton, Canadian physician, academic, and diplomat (died 1960)
- 1896 – Reverend Gary Davis, American singer and guitarist (died 1972)
- 1896 – Hans List, Austrian scientist and businessman, founded the AVL Engineering Company (died 1996)
- 1897 – Humberto Mauro, Brazilian director and screenwriter (died 1983)
- 1900 – Erni Krusten, Estonian author and poet (died 1984)

=== 1901–present ===
- 1901 – Simon Kuznets, Belarusian-American economist, statistician, and academic, Nobel Prize laureate (died 1985)
- 1902 – Theodore Schultz, American economist and academic, Nobel Prize laureate (died 1998)
- 1905 – Sergey Nikolsky, Russian mathematician and academic (died 2012)
- 1908 – Eve Arden, American actress (died 1990)
- 1908 – Bjarni Benediktsson, Icelandic professor of law and politician, 13th Prime Minister of Iceland (died 1970)
- 1908 – Frank Robert Miller, Canadian air marshal and politician (died 1997)
- 1909 – F. E. McWilliam, Irish sculptor and educator (died 1992)
- 1909 – Juliana of the Netherlands (died 2004)
- 1910 – Levi Celerio, Filipino pianist, violinist, and composer (died 2002)
- 1914 – Charles Beetham, American middle-distance runner (died 1997)
- 1914 – Dorival Caymmi, Brazilian singer-songwriter, actor, and painter (died 2008)
- 1916 – Paul Kuusberg, Estonian journalist and author (died 2003)
- 1916 – Claude Shannon, American mathematician and engineer (died 2001)
- 1916 – Robert Shaw, American conductor (died 1999)
- 1917 – Bea Wain, American singer (died 2017)
- 1920 – Duncan Hamilton, Irish-English race car driver and pilot (died 1994)
- 1920 – Gerda Lerner, Austrian-American historian and woman's history author (died 2013)
- 1920 – Tom Moore, British army officer and fundraiser (died 2021)
- 1921 – Roger L. Easton, American scientist, co-invented the GPS (died 2014)
- 1922 – Anton Murray, South African cricketer (died 1995)
- 1923 – Percy Heath, American bassist (died 2005)
- 1923 – Kagamisato Kiyoji, Japanese sumo wrestler, the 42nd Yokozuna (died 2004)
- 1924 – Sheldon Harnick, American lyricist (died 2023)
- 1924 – Uno Laht, Estonian KGB officer and author (died 2008)
- 1925 – Corinne Calvet, French actress (died 2001)
- 1925 – Johnny Horton, American singer-songwriter and guitarist (died 1960)
- 1926 – Shrinivas Khale, Indian composer (died 2011)
- 1926 – Cloris Leachman, American actress and comedian (died 2021)
- 1928 – Hugh Hood, Canadian author and academic (died 2000)
- 1928 – Orlando Sirola, Italian tennis player (died 1995)
- 1930 – Félix Guattari, French psychotherapist and philosopher (died 1992)
- 1933 – Charles Sanderson, Baron Sanderson of Bowden, English politician
- 1934 – Jerry Lordan, English singer-songwriter (died 1995)
- 1934 – Don McKenney, Canadian ice hockey player and coach (died 2022)
- 1937 – Tony Harrison, English poet and playwright (died 2025)
- 1938 – Gary Collins, American actor and talk show host (died 2012)
- 1938 – Juraj Jakubisko, Slovak director and screenwriter (died 2023)
- 1938 – Larry Niven, American author and screenwriter
- 1940 – Jeroen Brouwers, Dutch journalist and writer (died 2022)
- 1940 – Michael Cleary, Australian rugby player and politician
- 1940 – Ülo Õun, Estonian sculptor (died 1988)
- 1940 – Burt Young, American actor and painter (died 2023)
- 1941 – Stavros Dimas, Greek lawyer and politician, Greek Minister of Foreign Affairs
- 1941 – Max Merritt, New Zealand-Australian singer-songwriter (died 2020)
- 1942 – Sallehuddin of Kedah, Sultan of Kedah
- 1943 – Frederick Chiluba, Zambian politician, 2nd President of Zambia (died 2011)
- 1943 – Bobby Vee, American pop singer-songwriter (died 2016)
- 1944 – Jon Bing, Norwegian author, scholar, and academic (died 2014)
- 1944 – Jill Clayburgh, American actress (died 2010)
- 1945 – J. Michael Brady, British radiologist
- 1945 – Annie Dillard, American novelist, essayist, and poet (died 2026)
- 1945 – Mimi Fariña, American singer-songwriter, guitarist, and activist (died 2001)
- 1945 – Michael J. Smith, American pilot, and astronaut (died 1986)
- 1946 – King Carl XVI Gustaf of Sweden
- 1946 – Bill Plympton, American animator, producer, and screenwriter
- 1946 – Don Schollander, American swimmer
- 1947 – Paul Fiddes, English theologian and academic
- 1947 – Finn Kalvik, Norwegian singer-songwriter and guitarist
- 1947 – Tom Køhlert, Danish footballer and manager
- 1947 – Mats Odell, Swedish economist and politician, Swedish Minister for Financial Markets
- 1948 – Wayne Kramer, American guitarist and singer-songwriter (died 2024)
- 1948 – Margit Papp, Hungarian athlete
- 1948 – Pierre Pagé, Canadian ice hockey player and coach
- 1948 – Robert Tarjan, American computer scientist and mathematician
- 1949 – Phil Garner, American baseball player and manager (died 2026)
- 1949 – António Guterres, Portuguese academic and politician, 114th Prime Minister of Portugal and 9th Secretary-General of the United Nations
- 1949 – Karl Meiler, German tennis player (died 2014)
- 1952 – Jacques Audiard, French director and screenwriter
- 1952 – Jack Middelburg, Dutch motorcycle racer (died 1984)
- 1953 – Merrill Osmond, American singer and bass player
- 1954 – Jane Campion, New Zealand director, producer, and screenwriter
- 1954 – Kim Darroch, English diplomat, UK Permanent Representative to the European Union
- 1954 – Frank-Michael Marczewski, German footballer
- 1955 – Nicolas Hulot, French journalist and environmentalist
- 1955 – David Kitchin, English lawyer and judge
- 1955 – Pradeep Sarkar, Indian director and screenwriter (died 2023)
- 1955 – Zlatko Topčić, Bosnian writer and screenwriter
- 1956 – Lars von Trier, Danish director and screenwriter
- 1957 – Wonder Mike, American rapper and songwriter
- 1958 – Charles Berling, French actor, director, and screenwriter
- 1959 – Stephen Harper, Canadian economist and politician, 22nd Prime Minister of Canada
- 1960 – Geoffrey Cox, English lawyer and politician
- 1960 – Kerry Healey, American academic and politician, 70th Lieutenant Governor of Massachusetts
- 1961 – Arnór Guðjohnsen, Icelandic footballer
- 1961 – Isiah Thomas, American basketball player, coach, and sportscaster
- 1963 – Andrew Carwood, English tenor and conductor
- 1963 – Michael Waltrip, American race car driver and sportscaster
- 1964 – Tony Fernandes, Malaysian-Indian businessman, co-founded Tune Group
- 1964 – Ian Healy, Australian cricketer, coach, and sportscaster
- 1964 – Lorenzo Staelens, Belgian footballer and manager
- 1964 – Abhishek Chatterjee, Indian actor (died 2022)
- 1965 – Daniela Costian, Romanian-Australian discus thrower
- 1965 – Adrian Pasdar, American actor
- 1966 – Jeff Brown, Canadian ice hockey player and coach
- 1966 – Dave Meggett, American football player and coach
- 1967 – Phil Chang, Taiwanese singer-songwriter and actor
- 1967 – Philipp Kirkorov, Bulgarian-born Russian singer, composer and actor
- 1967 – Turbo B, American rapper
- 1969 – Warren Defever, American bass player and producer
- 1969 – Justine Greening, English accountant and politician, Secretary of State for International Development
- 1969 – Paulo Jr., Brazilian bass player
- 1972 – Takako Tokiwa, Japanese actress
- 1973 – Leigh Francis, English comedian and actor
- 1974 – Christian Tamminga, Dutch athlete
- 1975 – Johnny Galecki, American actor
- 1976 – Davian Clarke, Jamaican sprinter
- 1976 – Amanda Palmer, American singer-songwriter and pianist
- 1976 – Daniel Wagon, Australian rugby league player
- 1976 – Victor Glover, American astronaut
- 1977 – Jeannie Haddaway-Riccio, American politician
- 1977 – Meredith L. Patterson, American technologist, journalist, and author
- 1978 – Liljay, Taiwanese singer
- 1979 – Gerardo Torrado, Mexican footballer
- 1980 – Luis Scola, Argentinian basketball player
- 1980 – Jeroen Verhoeven, Dutch footballer
- 1981 – Nicole Kaczmarski, American basketball player
- 1981 – John O'Shea, Irish footballer
- 1981 – Kunal Nayyar, British-Indian actor
- 1981 – Justin Vernon, American singer-songwriter, multi-instrumentalist, and producer
- 1982 – Kirsten Dunst, American actress
- 1982 – Drew Seeley, Canadian-American singer-songwriter, dancer, and actor
- 1983 – Chris Carr, American football player
- 1983 – Tatjana Hüfner, German luger
- 1983 – Marina Tomić, Slovenian hurdler
- 1983 – Troy Williamson, American football player
- 1984 – Seimone Augustus, American basketball player
- 1984 – Shawn Daivari, American wrestler and manager
- 1984 – Risto Mätas, Estonian javelin thrower
- 1984 – Lee Roache, English footballer
- 1985 – Brandon Bass, American basketball player
- 1985 – Gal Gadot, Israeli actress and model
- 1985 – Ashley Alexandra Dupré, American journalist, singer, and prostitute
- 1986 – Dianna Agron, American actress and singer
- 1986 – Martten Kaldvee, Estonian biathlete
- 1987 – Alipate Carlile, Australian footballer
- 1987 – Chris Morris, South African cricketer
- 1987 – Rohit Sharma, Indian cricketer
- 1988 – Andy Allen, Australian chef
- 1988 – Sander Baart, Dutch field hockey player
- 1988 – Ana de Armas, Cuban actress
- 1988 – Liu Xijun, Chinese singer
- 1988 – Oh Hye-ri, South Korean taekwondo athlete
- 1989 – Jang Wooyoung, South Korean singer and actor
- 1990 – Jonny Brownlee, English triathlete
- 1990 – Mac DeMarco, Canadian singer-songwriter
- 1990 – Kaarel Kiidron, Estonian footballer
- 1990 – Paula Ribó, Spanish singer-songwriter and actress
- 1991 – Chris Kreider, American ice hockey player
- 1991 – Travis Scott, American rapper and producer
- 1992 – Marcel Bauer, German politician
- 1992 – Goodnight Chicken, Taiwanese YouTuber
- 1992 – Marc-André ter Stegen, German footballer
- 1993 – Dion Dreesens, Dutch swimmer
- 1993 – Martin Fuksa, Czech canoeist
- 1994 – Chae Seo-jin, South Korean actress
- 1994 – Wang Yafan, Chinese tennis player
- 1996 – Luke Friend, English singer
- 1997 – Adam Ryczkowski, Polish footballer
- 1998 – Georgina Amorós, Spanish actress
- 1999 – Jorden van Foreest, Dutch chess grandmaster
- 1999 – Krit Amnuaydechkorn, Thai actor and singer
- 2000 – Yui Hiwatashi, Japanese singer
- 2000 – Dean James, Indonesian footballer
- 2002 – Anna Cramling, Spanish-Swedish chess player
- 2002 – Teden Mengi, English footballer
- 2003 – Emily Carey, British actress
- 2003 – Jung Yun-seok, South Korean actor

== Deaths ==
=== Pre-1600 ===
- AD 65 – Lucan, Roman poet (born 39)
- 125 – An, Chinese emperor (born 94)
- 535 – Amalasuntha, Ostrogothic queen and regent
- 783 – Hildegard of the Vinzgau, Frankish queen
- 1002 – Eckard I, German nobleman
- 1030 – Mahmud of Ghazni, Ghaznavid emir (born 971)
- 1063 – Ren Zong, Chinese emperor (born 1010)
- 1131 – Adjutor, French knight and saint
- 1305 – Roger de Flor, Italian military adventurer (born 1267)
- 1341 – John III, duke of Brittany (born 1286)
- 1439 – Richard Beauchamp, 13th Earl of Warwick, English commander (born 1382)
- 1524 – Pierre Terrail, seigneur de Bayard, French soldier (born 1473)
- 1544 – Thomas Audley, 1st Baron Audley of Walden, English lawyer and judge, Lord Chancellor of England (born 1488)
- 1550 – Tabinshwehti, Burmese king (born 1516)

=== 1601–1900 ===
- 1632 – Johann Tserclaes, Count of Tilly, Bavarian general (born 1559)
- 1632 – Sigismund III Vasa, Swedish-Polish son of John III of Sweden (born 1566)
- 1637 – Niwa Nagashige, Japanese daimyō (born 1571)
- 1655 – Eustache Le Sueur, French painter (born 1617)
- 1660 – Petrus Scriverius, Dutch historian and scholar (born 1576)
- 1672 – Marie of the Incarnation, French-Canadian nun and saint, founded the Ursulines of Quebec (born 1599)
- 1696 – Robert Plot, English chemist and academic (born 1640)
- 1712 – Philipp van Limborch, Dutch theologian and author (born 1633)
- 1733 – Rodrigo Anes de Sá Almeida e Meneses, 1st Marquis of Abrantes, Portuguese diplomat (born 1676)
- 1736 – Johann Albert Fabricius, German scholar and author (born 1668)
- 1758 – François d'Agincourt, French organist and composer (born 1684)
- 1792 – John Montagu, 4th Earl of Sandwich, English politician, Secretary of State for the Northern Department (born 1718)
- 1795 – Jean-Jacques Barthélemy, French archaeologist and author (born 1716)
- 1806 – Onogawa Kisaburō, Japanese sumo wrestler, the 5th Yokozuna (born 1758)
- 1841 – Peter Andreas Heiberg, Danish philologist and author (born 1758)
- 1847 – Charles, Austrian commander and duke of Teschen (born 1771)
- 1863 – Jean Danjou, French Army officer, killed in action at the Battle of Camarón (born 1828)
- 1864 – John B. Cocke, Confederate States Army officer, killed in action at the Battle of Jenkins' Ferry (born c. 1833)
- 1865 – Robert FitzRoy, English admiral, meteorologist, and politician, 2nd Governor of New Zealand (born 1805)
- 1870 – Thomas Cooke, Canadian bishop and missionary (born 1792)
- 1875 – Jean-Frédéric Waldeck, French explorer, lithographer, and cartographer (born 1766)
- 1879 – Emma Smith, American religious leader (born 1804)
- 1883 – Édouard Manet, French painter (born 1832)
- 1891 – Joseph Leidy, American paleontologist and author (born 1823)
- 1899 – Ludwig Büchner, German physiologist and physician (born 1824)
- 1900 – Casey Jones, American railroad engineer (born 1864)

=== 1901–present ===
- 1903 – Emily Stowe, Canadian physician and activist (born 1831)
- 1910 – Jean Moréas, Greek poet and critic (born 1856)
- 1926 – Bessie Coleman, American pilot (born 1892)
- 1936 – A. E. Housman, English poet and scholar (born 1859)
- 1939 – Frank Haller, American boxer (born 1883)
- 1943 – Eddy Hamel, American footballer (born 1902)
- 1943 – Otto Jespersen, Danish linguist and academic (born 1860)
- 1943 – Beatrice Webb, English sociologist and economist (born 1858)
- 1945 – Eva Braun, German photographer and office and lab assistant, wife of Adolf Hitler (born 1912)
- 1945 – Adolf Hitler, Austrian-German politician and author, dictator of Nazi Germany (born 1889)
- 1953 – Jacob Linzbach, Estonian linguist and author (born 1874)
- 1956 – Alben W. Barkley, American lawyer and politician, 35th Vice President of the United States (born 1877)
- 1970 – Jacques Presser, Dutch historian, writer and poet (born 1899)
- 1970 – Inger Stevens, Swedish-American actress (born 1934)
- 1972 – Gia Scala, English-American model and actress (born 1934)
- 1973 – Václav Renč, Czech poet and playwright (born 1911)
- 1974 – Agnes Moorehead, American actress (born 1900)
- 1980 – Luis Muñoz Marín, Puerto Rican journalist and politician, 1st Governor of Puerto Rico (born 1898)
- 1982 – Lester Bangs, American journalist and author (born 1949)
- 1983 – George Balanchine, Russian dancer and choreographer (born 1904)
- 1983 – Muddy Waters, American singer-songwriter, guitarist, and bandleader (born 1913)
- 1983 – Edouard Wyss-Dunant, Swiss physician and mountaineer (born 1897)
- 1986 – Robert Stevenson, English director, producer, and screenwriter (born 1905)
- 1989 – Sergio Leone, Italian director, producer, and screenwriter (born 1929)
- 1993 – Tommy Caton, English footballer (born 1962)
- 1994 – Roland Ratzenberger, Austrian race car driver (born 1960)
- 1994 – Richard Scarry, American author and illustrator (born 1919)
- 1995 – Maung Maung Kha, Burmese colonel and politician, 8th Prime Minister of Burma (born 1920)
- 1998 – Nizar Qabbani, Syrian-English poet, publisher, and diplomat (born 1926)
- 2000 – Poul Hartling, Danish politician, 36th Prime Minister of Denmark (born 1914)
- 2002 – Charlotte von Mahlsdorf, German philanthropist, founded the Gründerzeit Museum (born 1928)
- 2003 – Mark Berger, American economist and academic (born 1955)
- 2003 – Possum Bourne, New Zealand race car driver (born 1956)
- 2005 – Phil Rasmussen, American lieutenant and pilot (born 1918)
- 2006 – Jean-François Revel, French philosopher (born 1924)
- 2006 – Pramoedya Ananta Toer, Indonesian author and academic (born 1925)
- 2007 – Kevin Mitchell, American football player (born 1971)
- 2007 – Mitiarjuk Nappaaluk, Inuk writer (born 1931)
- 2007 – Tom Poston, American actor, comedian, and game show panelist (born 1921)
- 2007 – Gordon Scott, American film and television actor (born 1926)
- 2008 – Juancho Evertsz, Dutch Antillean politician (born 1923)
- 2009 – Henk Nijdam, Dutch cyclist (born 1935)
- 2011 – Dorjee Khandu, Indian politician, 6th Chief Minister of Arunachal Pradesh (born 1955)
- 2011 – Evald Okas, Estonian painter (born 1915)
- 2011 – Ernesto Sabato, Argentinian physicist, author, and painter (born 1911)
- 2012 – Tomás Borge, Nicaraguan poet and politician, co-founded the Sandinista National Liberation Front (born 1930)
- 2012 – Alexander Dale Oen, Norwegian swimmer (born 1985)
- 2012 – Giannis Gravanis, Greek footballer (born 1958)
- 2012 – Benzion Netanyahu, Russian-Israeli historian and academic (born 1910)
- 2013 – Roberto Chabet, Filipino painter and sculptor (born 1937)
- 2013 – Shirley Firth, Canadian skier (born 1953)
- 2013 – Viviane Forrester, French author and critic (born 1925)
- 2014 – Khaled Choudhury, Indian painter and set designer (born 1919)
- 2014 – Julian Lewis, English biologist and academic (born 1946)
- 2014 – Carl E. Moses, American businessman and politician (born 1929)
- 2014 – Ian Ross, Australian journalist (born 1940)
- 2015 – Ben E. King, American singer-songwriter and producer (born 1938)
- 2016 – Daniel Berrigan, American priest and activist (born 1921)
- 2016 – Harry Kroto, English chemist and academic, Nobel Prize laureate (born 1939)
- 2017 – Belchior, Brazilian singer and composer (born 1946)
- 2019 – Peter Mayhew, English-American actor (born 1944)
- 2020 – Tony Allen, Nigerian drummer and composer (born 1940)
- 2020 – Rishi Kapoor, Indian actor, film director and producer (born 1952)
- 2021 – Anthony Payne, English composer (born 1936)
- 2022 – Naomi Judd, American singer-songwriter and actress (born 1946)
- 2022 – Mino Raiola, Italian football agent (born 1967)
- 2023 – Jock Zonfrillo, Scottish television presenter and chef (born 1976)
- 2024 – Paul Auster, American writer and film director (born 1947)

== Holidays and observances ==
- Armed Forces Day (Georgia)
- Camarón Day (French Foreign Legion)
- Children's Day (Mexico)
- Christian feast day:
  - Adjutor
  - Aimo
  - Amator, Peter and Louis
  - Donatus of Evorea
  - Eutropius of Saintes
  - Marie Guyart (Anglican Church of Canada and Catholic Church)
  - Maximus of Rome
  - Blessed Miles Gerard
  - Pomponius of Naples
  - Pope Pius V
  - Quirinus of Neuss
  - Sarah Josepha Hale (Episcopal Church)
  - Suitbert the Younger
  - April 30 (Eastern Orthodox liturgics)
- Consumer Protection Day (Thailand)
- Honesty Day (United States)
- International Jazz Day (UNESCO)
- Martyrs' Day (Pakistan)
- May Eve, the eve of the first day of summer in the Northern hemisphere (see May 1):
  - Beltane begins at sunset in the Northern hemisphere, Samhain begins at sunset in the Southern hemisphere. (Neo-Druidic Wheel of the Year)
  - Walpurgis Night (Central and Northern Europe)
- National Persian Gulf Day (Iran)
- Reunification Day (Vietnam)
- Rincon Day (Bonaire)
- Russian State Fire Service Day (Russia)
- Teachers' Day (Paraguay)
