= Hôtel de Ville, Vernon =

Town hall in Vernon, Eure, France

Hôtel de Ville
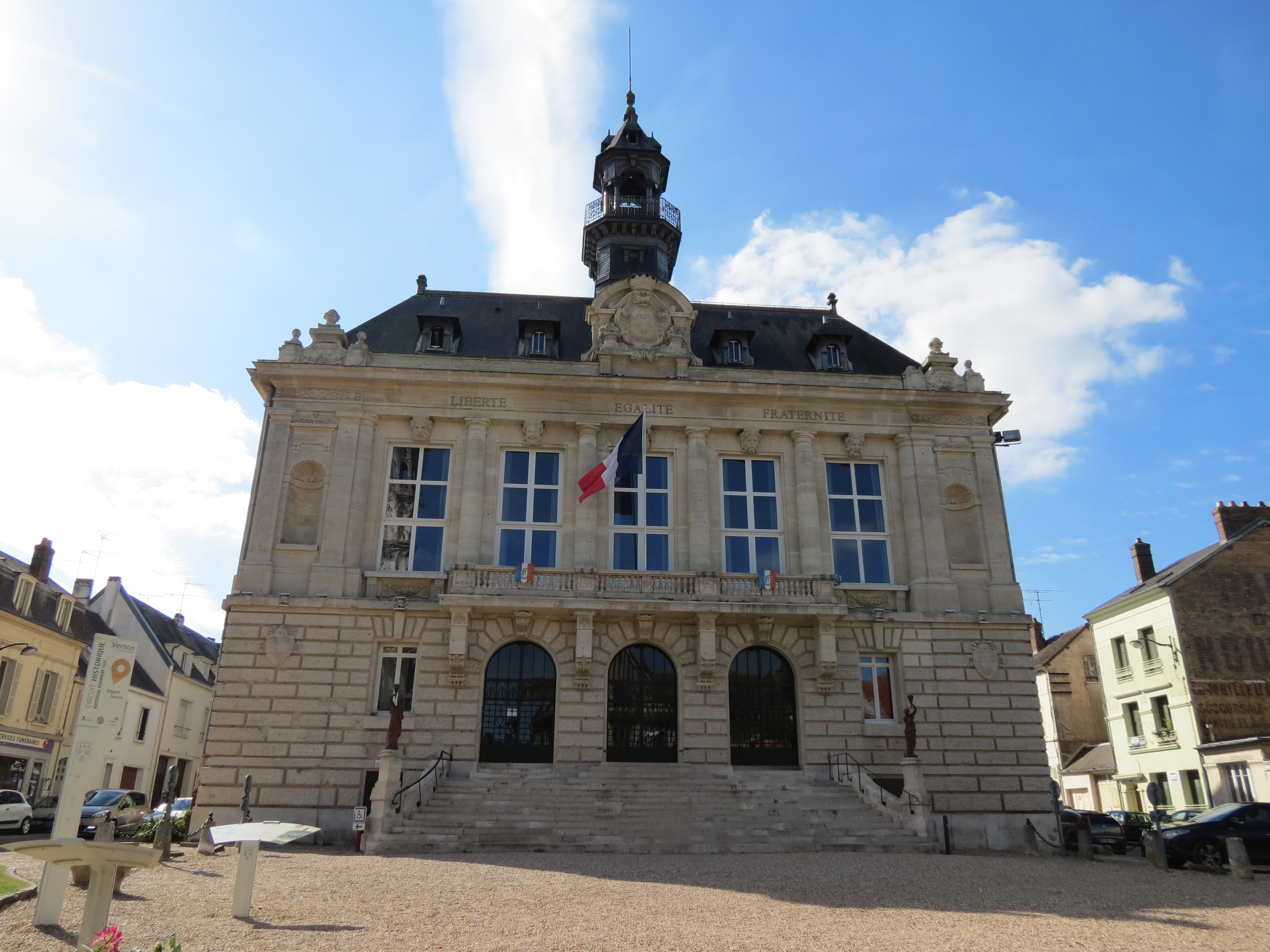
- The main frontage of the Hôtel de Ville in September 2018
- Interactive map of the Hôtel de Ville area

General information
- Type: City hall
- Architectural style: Neoclassical style
- Location: Vernon, France
- Coordinates: 49.0930°N 1.4855°E
- Completed: 1895

Design and construction
- Architects: Georges Debriès and Adolphe Henry

The Hôtel de Ville (French pronunciation: [otɛl də vil], City Hall) is a municipal building in Vernon, Eure, in northern France, standing on Rue Carnot. It has been included on the Inventaire général des monuments by the French Ministry of Culture since 1997.

== History ==
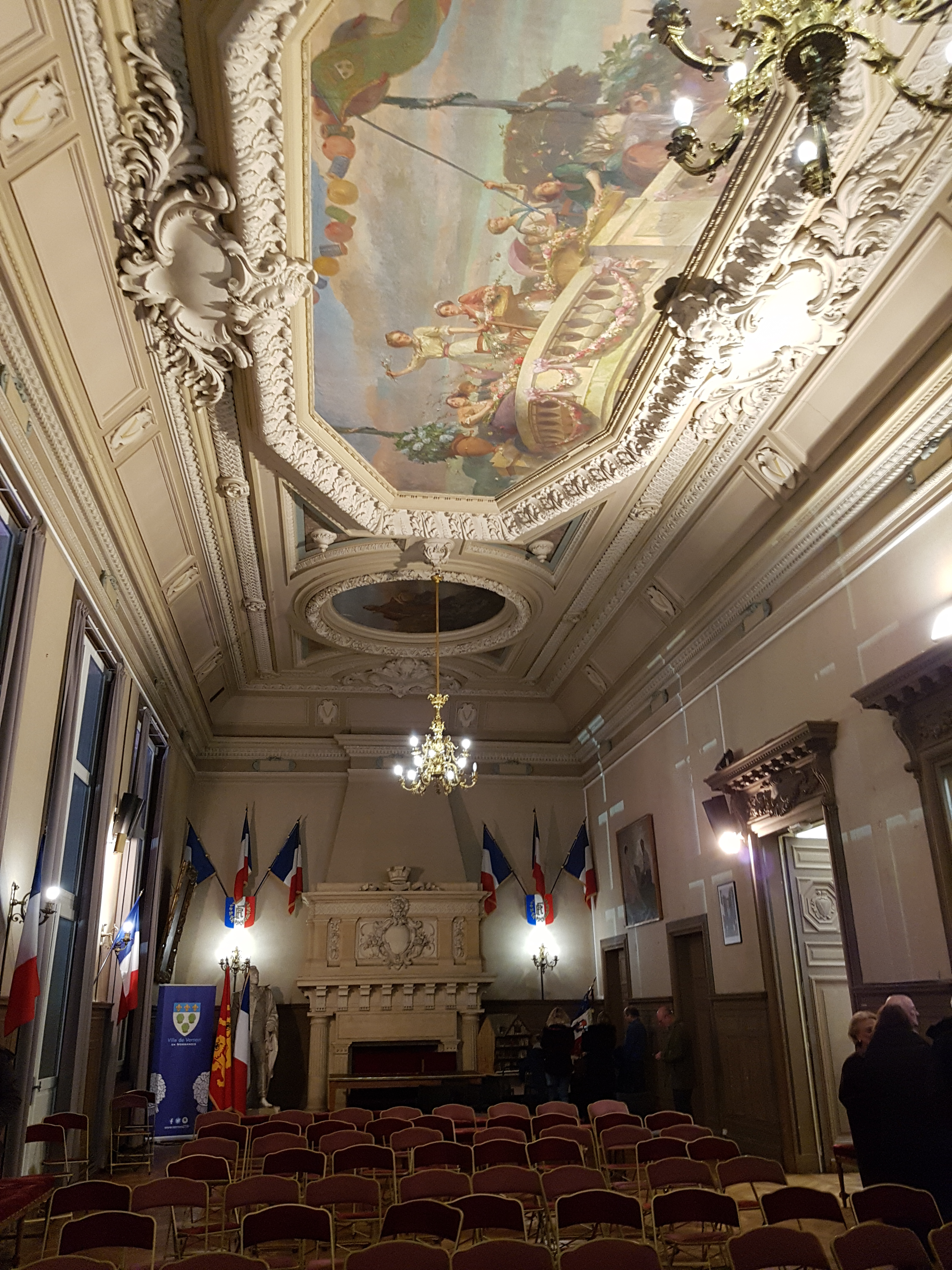
The wedding room

Under the Ancien régime, the consuls established a town hall on Rue Grande opposite the Collegiate church of Notre-Dame de Vernon. It was in this building that an English naval officer, Christopher Nesham, saved the life of a local corn merchant who was about to be lynched by a mob in October 1789 during the French Revolution. Civic leaders decided to confer citizenship on Nesham in appreciation of his service to the town.

In the late 19th century, after the old building became too cramped, the town council led by the mayor, Adolphe Barette, decided to demolish the old building and the surrounding houses and to erect a new building on the same site. The foundation stone for the new building was laid in May 1894. It was designed by Georges Debriès and Adolphe Henry in the neoclassical style, built in ashlar stone from local quarries and was officially opened by Barette on 10 September 1895.

The design involved a symmetrical main frontage of seven bays facing towards the church. The ground floor was rusticticated. The central section of three bays featured a wide flight of steps leading up to three round headed openings; there were three French doors on the first floor, fronted by a balustraded balcony and flanked by Doric order columns supporting an entablature, a cornice and a parapet. Above the central bay, there was a pediment containing a coat of arms. Behind the pediment, there was a steep roof surmounted by an octagonal lantern. The bays on either side of the central section were fenestrated in a similar style and the outer bays contained niches, which were created to accommodate busts of Barette and of a general who commanded in the Napoleonic Wars, Louis-Gabriel Suchet, duc d'Albuféra, but they were never filled. Internally, the principal room was the Salle des Mariages (wedding room). The ceilings of the room, depicting cider and wine production as well as a flower festival, were painted by the artist, Charles Denet, in the late 19th century.

A large fountain, in the form of a nymph standing in a basin supported by sea monsters, was designed and paid for by a deputy mayor, Pierre-Amédée Défontaines. It was unveiled in the garden behind the town hall in 1899. A bust of Barette was created by the sculptor, Albert Miserey, and placed in the garden behind the town hall around the same time. It was melted down during the Second World War and subsequently replaced by a plaster cast which was placed inside the town hall.

A fine stained glass window, depicting Louis IX tasting watercress at the fountain of Tilly, was created by the glassmaker, François Décorchemont, and installed on the main staircase of the building in the mid-20th century.
