= Vernon, Eure =

Vernon
- Commune
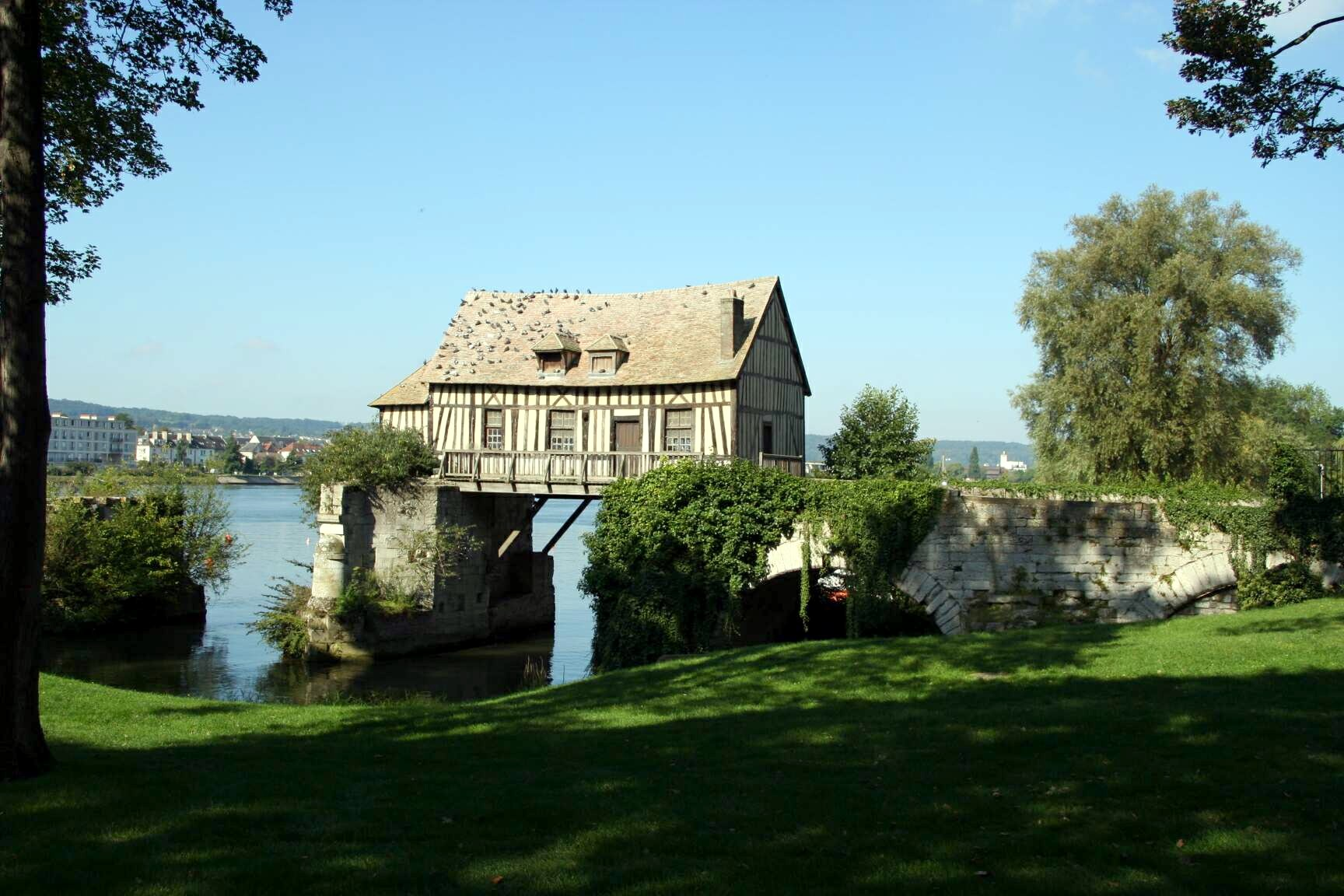
- Old mill on the broken bridge

- Coat of arms
- Location of Vernon
- Location within France Location within Normandy
- Coordinates: 49°05′N 1°29′E
- Country: France
- Region: Normandy
- Department: Eure
- Arrondissement: Les Andelys
- Canton: Vernon
- Intercommunality: Seine Normandie Agglomération

Government
  - Mayor (2026–2032): François Ouzilleau
- Area^{1}: 34.92 km^{2} (13.48 sq mi)
- Highest elevation: 148 m (486 ft)
- Lowest elevation: 10 m (33 ft)
- Population (2023): 25,290
  - Density: 724.2/km^{2} (1,876/sq mi)
- Demonym: Vernonnais
- Time zone: UTC+01:00 (CET)
  - Summer (DST): UTC+02:00 (CEST)
- INSEE/Postal code: 27681 /27200
- Website: www.vernon27.fr
- ^{1} French Land Register data, which excludes lakes, ponds, glaciers > 1 km^{2} (0.386 sq mi or 247 acres) and river estuaries.

Vernon (French pronunciation: [vɛʁnɔ̃]; Norman: Vernoun) is a commune in the French department of Eure, region of Normandy, northern France. It lies on the banks of the river Seine on the departmental border with Yvelines, about midway between Paris and Rouen. Vernon–Giverny station – which also serves neighbouring Giverny and its world-renowned Maison Monet – has rail connections to both.

The town is known for its production of engines by the SNECMA group. It is also the hometown of current Prime Minister Sébastien Lecornu.

== History ==
Mentioned in a Latin written document as Vernum, the /m/ at the end could be the last remains of the Celtic magus 'plain' or 'market', or it is a simple latinization, and the origin is just the Celtic word *uerno, alder tree (Breton gwern, Welsh gwern, Irish fern, modern French verne).

The village gave its name to a family who took part in the Norman Conquest of England, and then became a British first name.

The Hôtel de Ville was completed in 1895.

The town is home to the Établissement Saint-Adjutor, a notable private school.

=== Important dates ===
- 750 – First mention of the name Vernon by Pepin the Short.
- 1070 – Birth of Saint Adjutor.
- 1123 – Building of Vernon Castle
- 1153 – Vernon is besieged by king Louis VII.
- 1196 – Vernon is joined to the royal domain by King Philip II Augustus.
- 1227 – Saint-Louis comes to Vernon.
- 1415 – Vernon becomes English.
- 1449 – Vernon passes to France (king Charles VII).
- 1596 – 8 October, Henry IV visits Bizy Castle.
- 1600 – Construction of the Vieux-Moulin (old mill).
- 1606 – Henry IV creates a school.
- 1723 – Creation of the Avenue des Capucins.
- 1789 – Thomas Jefferson, his family, and Sally and James Hemings stop at Vernon on their way to Le Havre to return to America.
- 1804 – Vernonnet is attached to Vernon.
- 1810 – Napoleon comes to Vernon.
- 1843 – Arrival of the Paris-Rouen-Le Havre railroad.
- 1858 – Building of the Saint-Louis Hospital.
- 1860 – Highworks urbanism in the centre by Suchet d'Albuféra.
- 1862 – Building of the library.
- 1895 – Inauguration of the new Hôtel de Ville by Adolphe Barette.
- 1897 – First cinema show at the Vernon Theatre.
- 1910 – The Seine river floods the town.
- 1946 – Arrival of 28 German scientists from Peenemünde to develop French rockets.
- 1951 – First attempt to launch a Véronique rocket (Vernonelectronic)
- 1955 – Inauguration of the Clémenceau Bridge.
- 1966 – Building of the Georges Dumézil high school.
- 1983 – First edition of the Foire aux Cerises (cherry fair).
- 1992 – Building of the Espace Culturel Philippe Auguste.

== Population ==
Historical population

Year	Pop.	±% p.a.
1793	4,029	—
1800	5,202	+3.72%
1806	4,793	−1.36%
1821	4,812	+0.03%
1831	4,888	+0.16%
1836	5,301	+1.64%
1841	6,128	+2.94%
1846	5,204	−3.22%
1851	6,463	+4.43%
1856	7,674	+3.49%
1861	7,410	−0.70%
1866	7,787	+1.00%
1872	7,961	+0.37%
1876	7,636	−1.04%
1881	7,881	+0.63%
1886	8,164	+0.71%
1891	8,288	+0.30%
1896	8,492	+0.49%
1901	8,757	+0.62%

Year	Pop.	±% p.a.
1906	8,667	−0.21%
1911	8,733	+0.15%
1921	8,814	+0.09%
1926	9,725	+1.99%
1931	10,621	+1.78%
1936	11,330	+1.30%
1946	11,242	−0.08%
1954	14,460	+3.20%
1962	17,247	+2.23%
1968	18,872	+1.51%
1975	22,422	+2.49%
1982	22,243	−0.11%
1990	23,659	+0.77%
1999	24,056	+0.19%
2007	24,598	+0.28%
2012	24,112	−0.40%
2017	23,872	−0.20%
2023	25,290	+0.97%

Source: EHESS and INSEE (1968-2023)

== Twin towns – sister cities ==
Vernon is twinned with:

- Bad Kissingen, Germany
- Massa, Italy

== Notable people ==
- Michel de La Vigne (1588–1648), doctor
- Philippe Montanier (born 1964), football player and manager
- Chantal Jouanno (born 1969), politician
- Tongo Doumbia (born 1989), footballer
- Marie-Charlotte Garin (born 1995), politician
- Ibrahim Keita (born 1996), footballer
- Ousmane Dembélé (born 1997), footballer
- Jared Khasa (born 1997), footballer

== Gallery ==
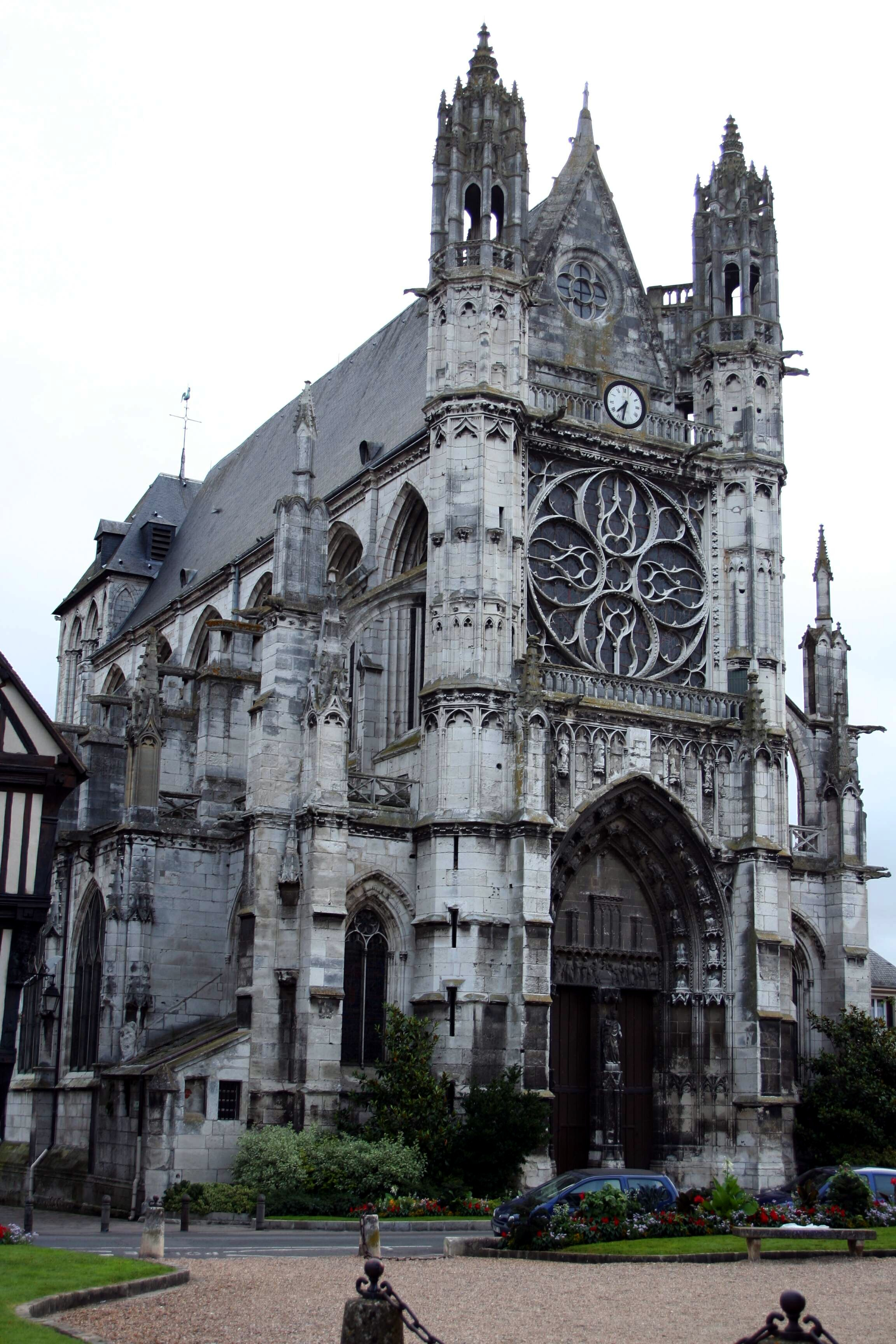
Collégiale Notre-Dame (now Parish Church)

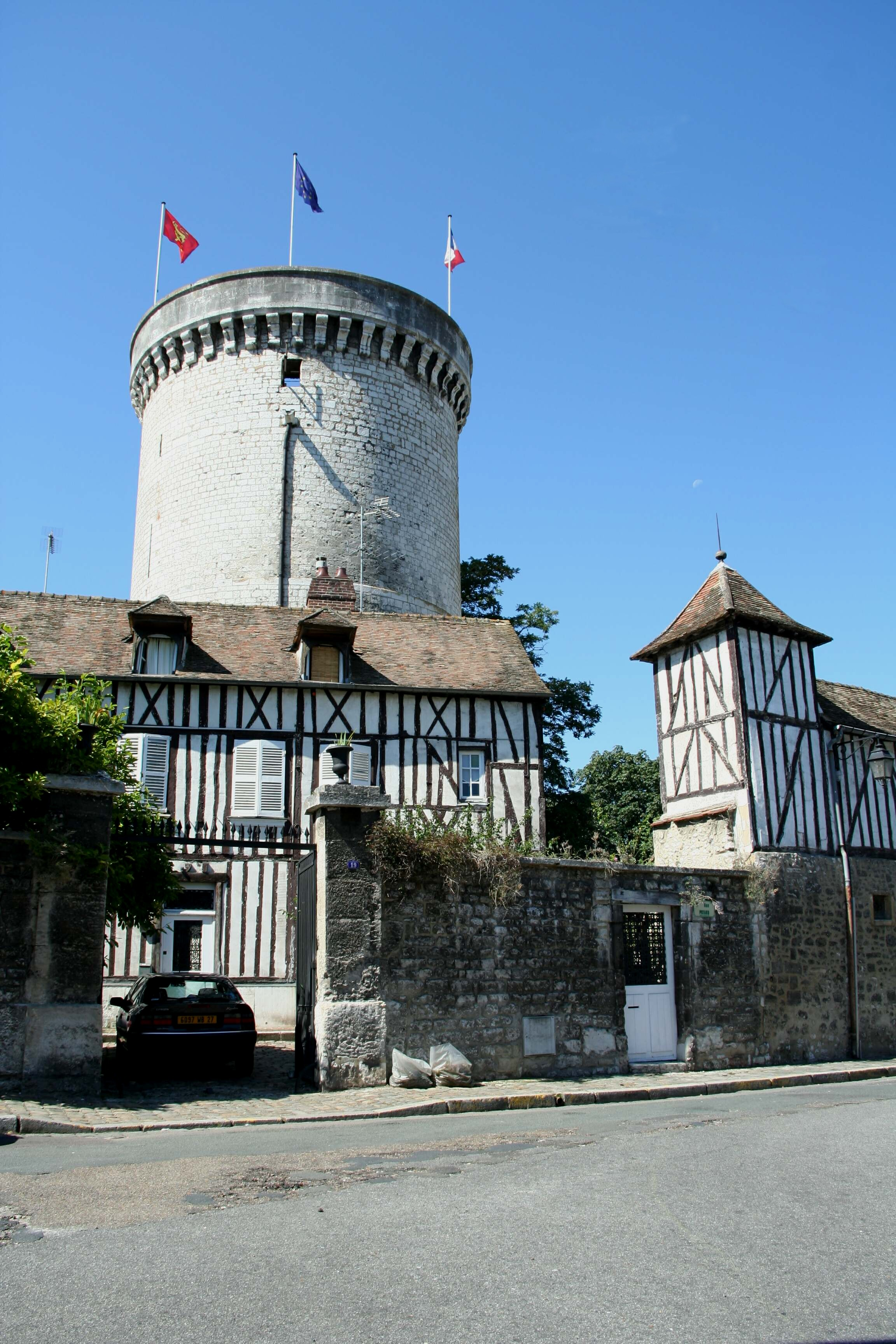
Tour des archives (Philippe Auguste's Keep)

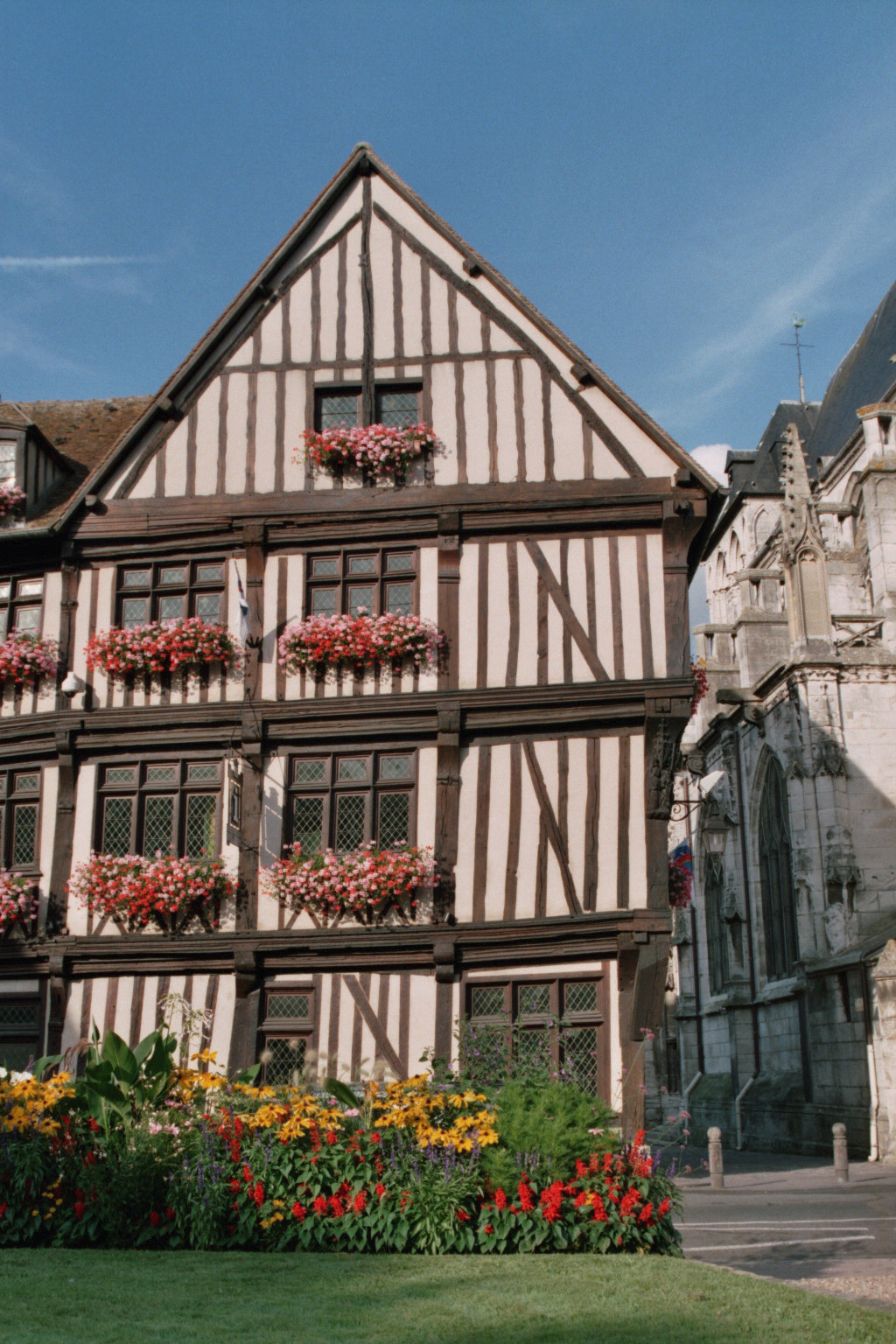
Maison du Temps Jadis (Medieval House)

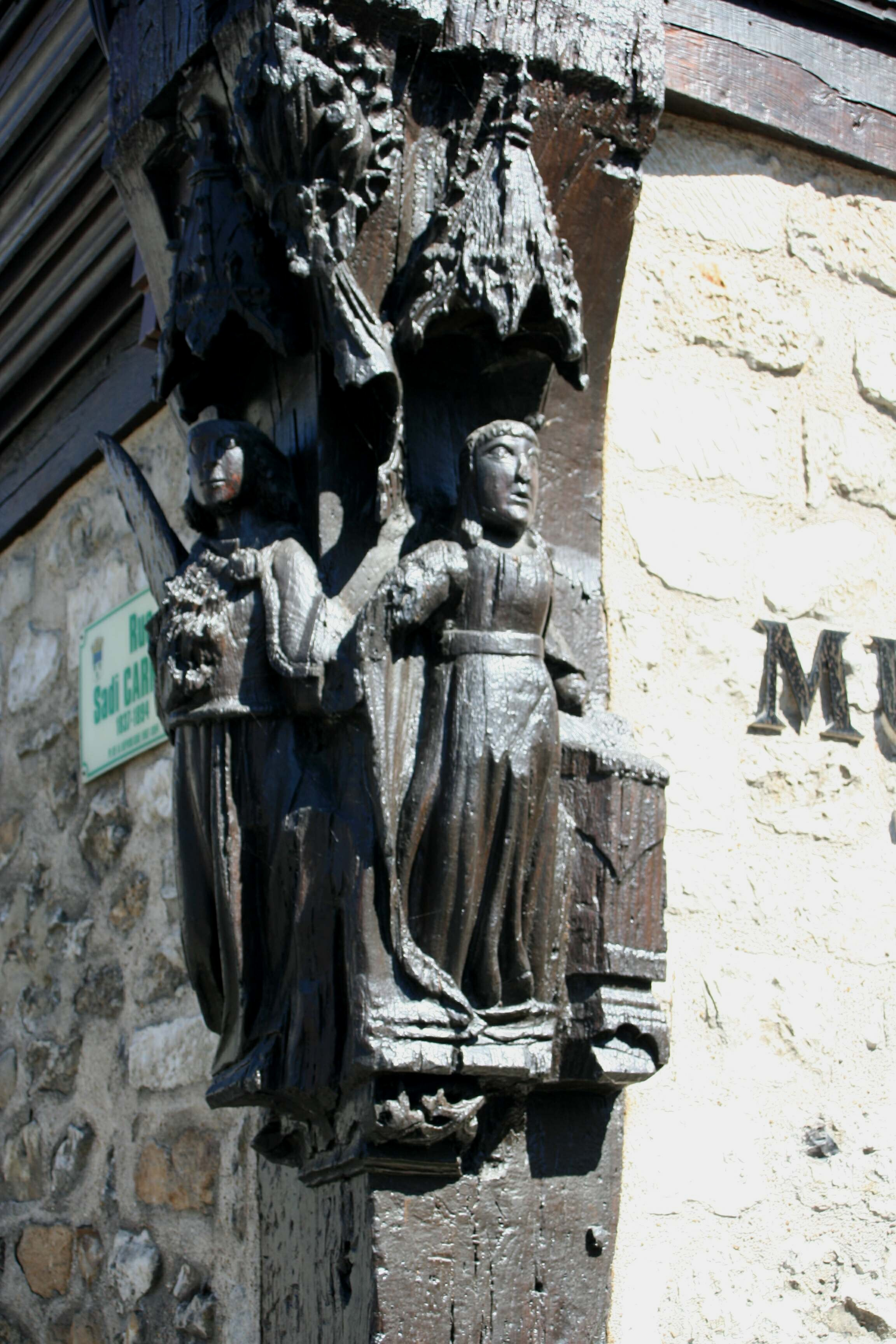
Corner of Rue du Pont and Rue Carnot

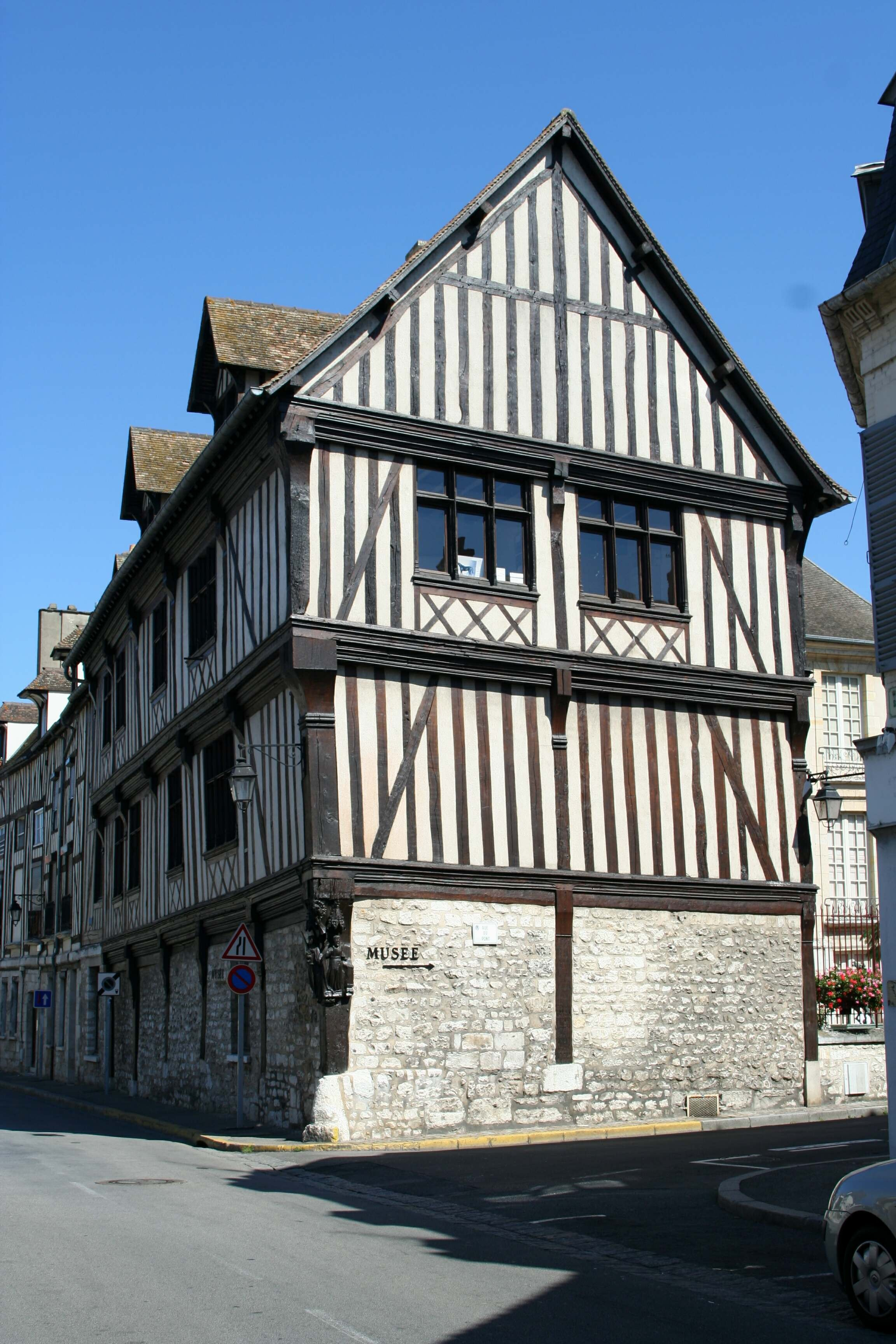
Museum

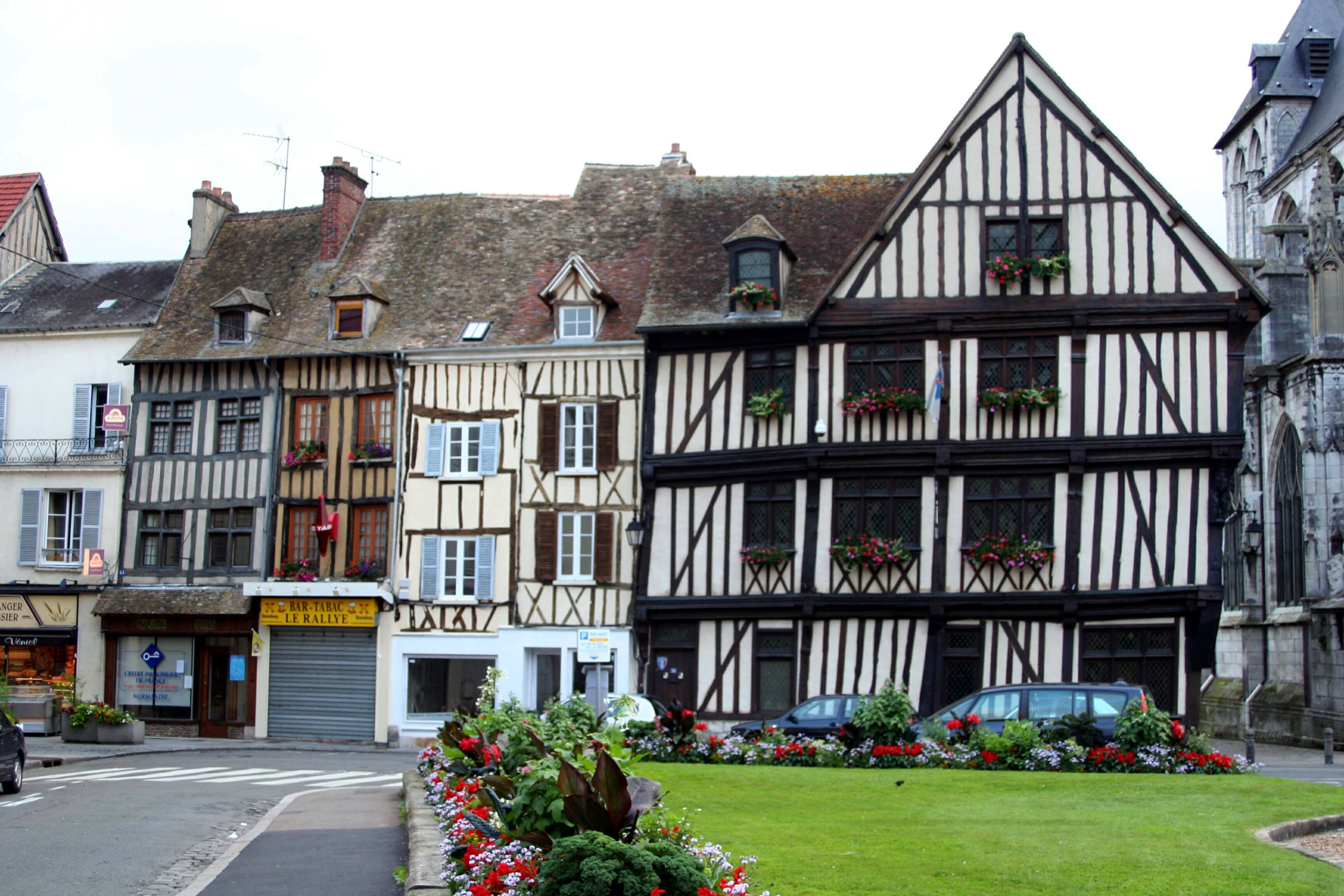
Place Barette

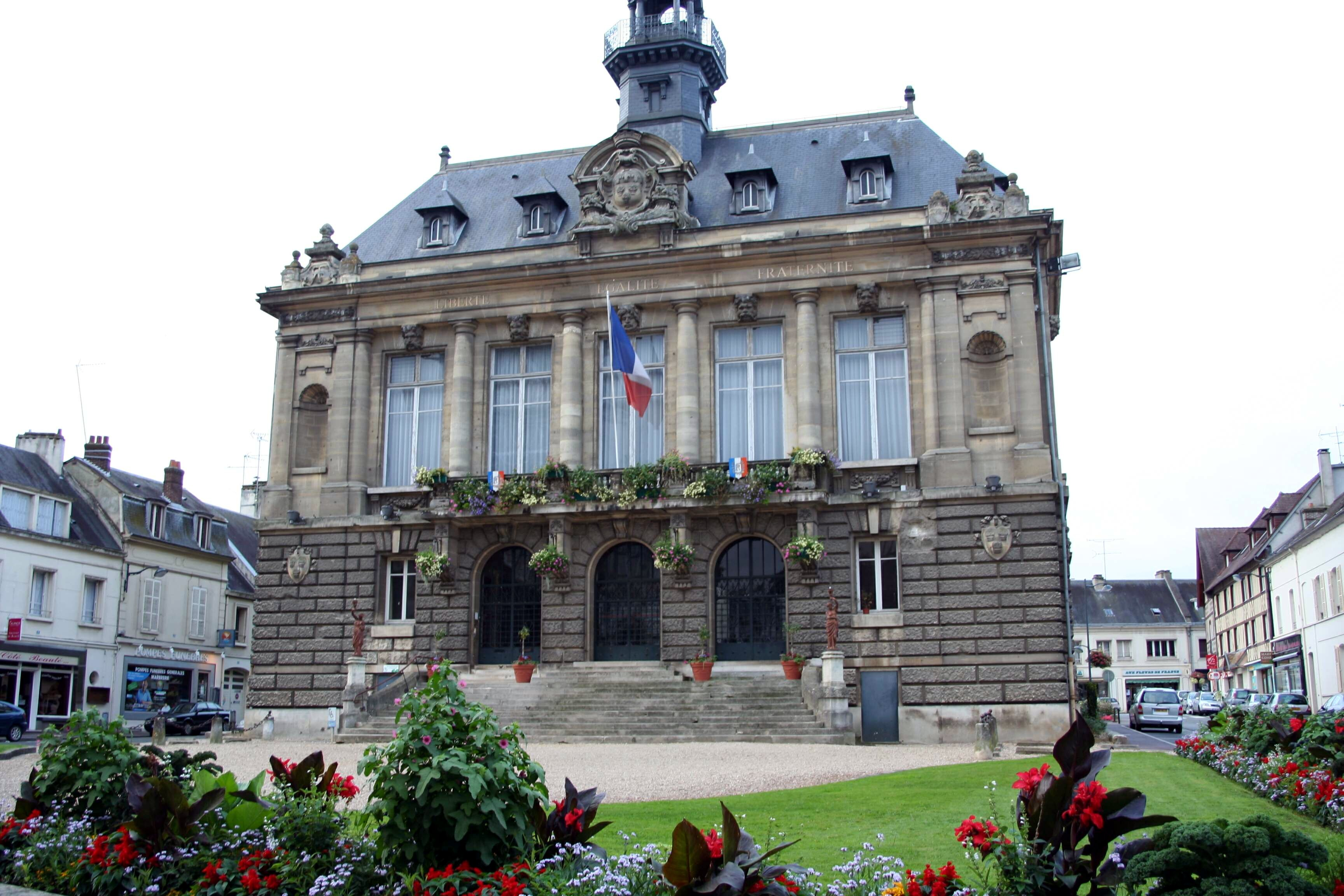
Hôtel de Ville

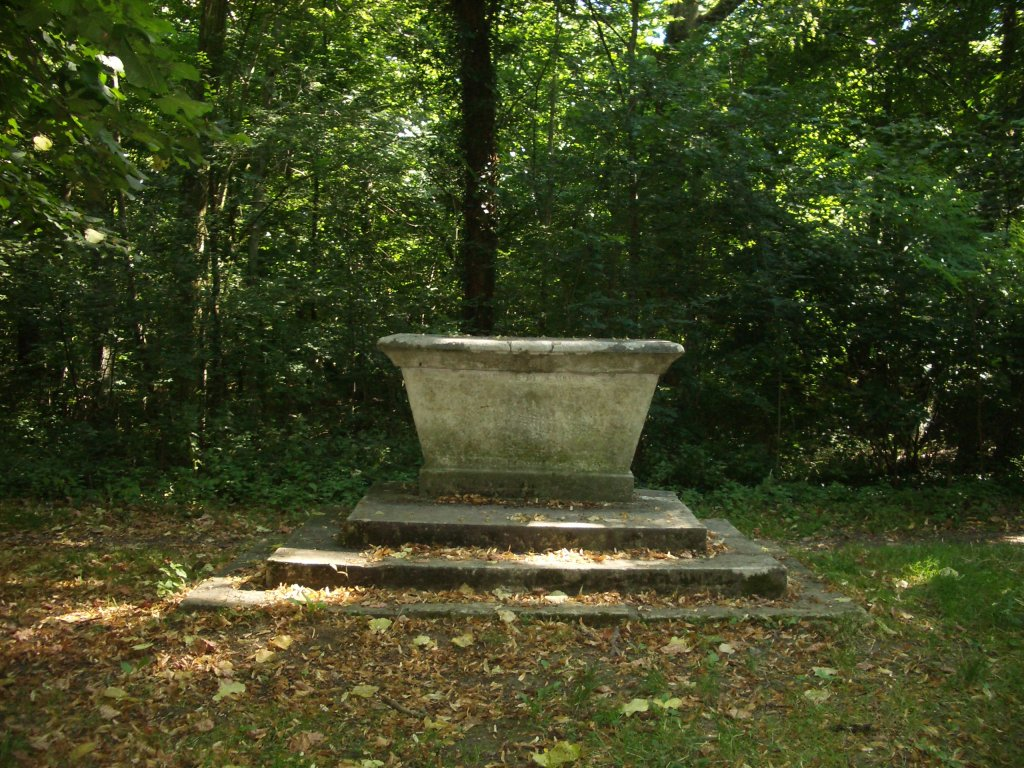
Tomb of Saint-Mauxe

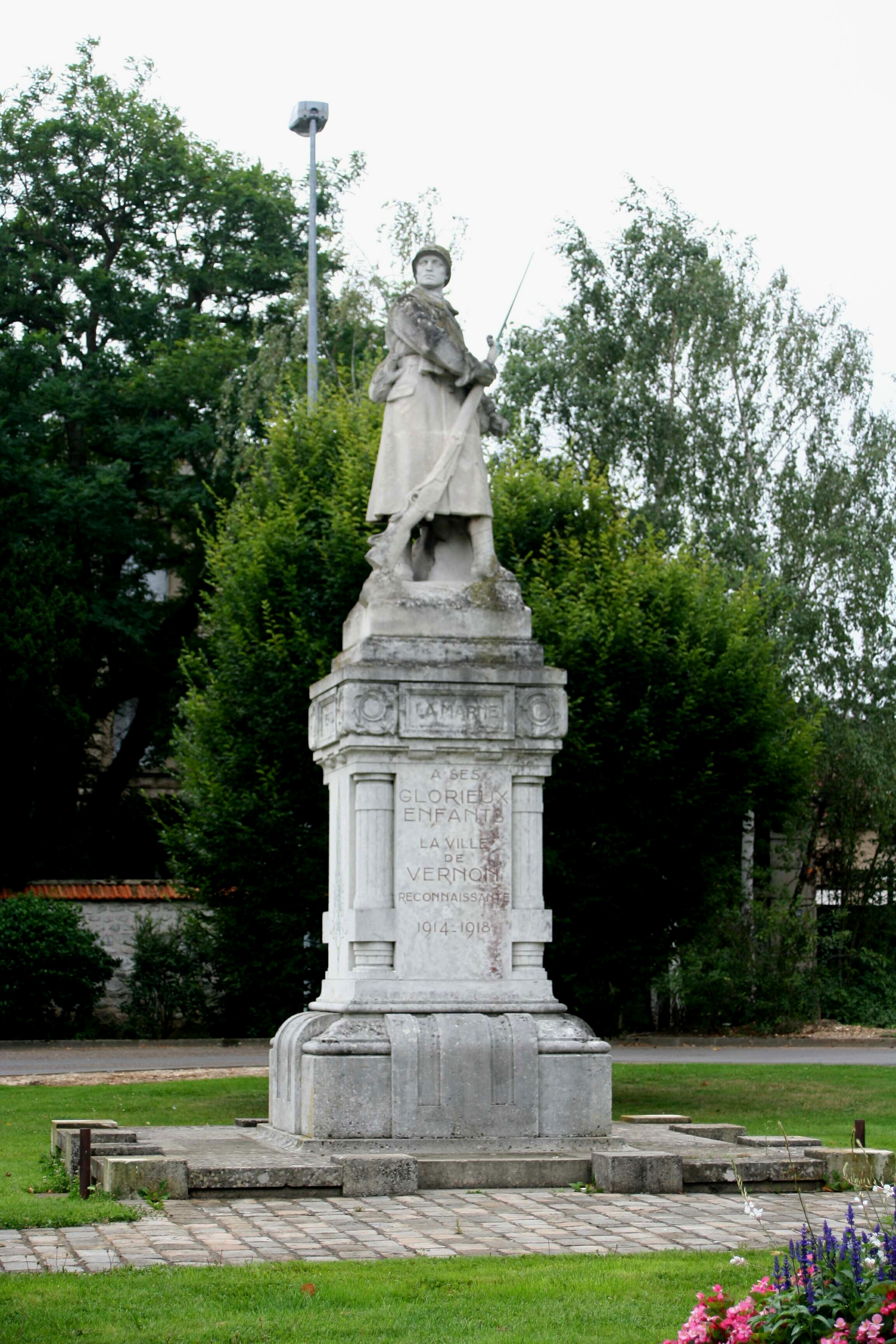
War memorial

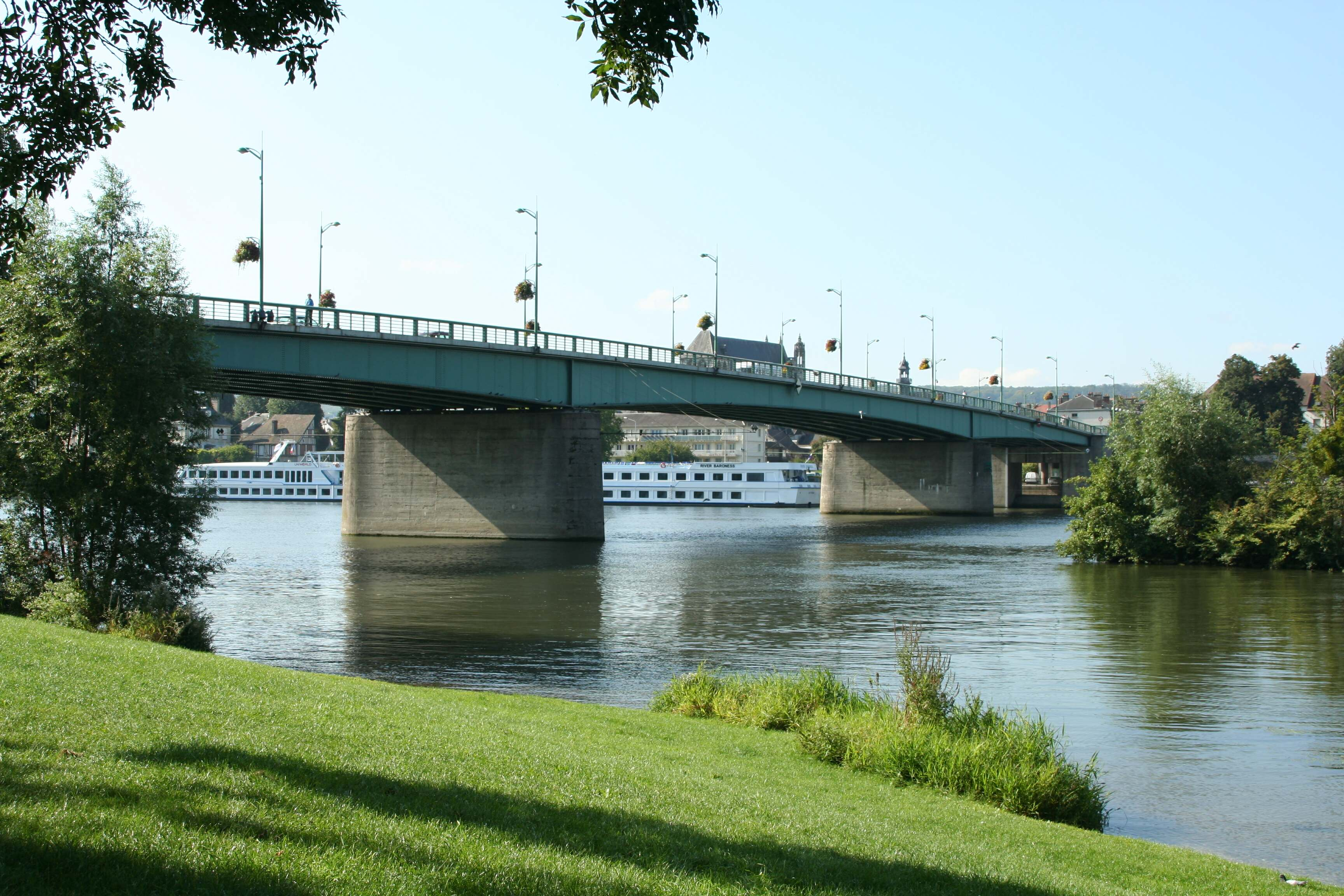
Pont Clemenceau

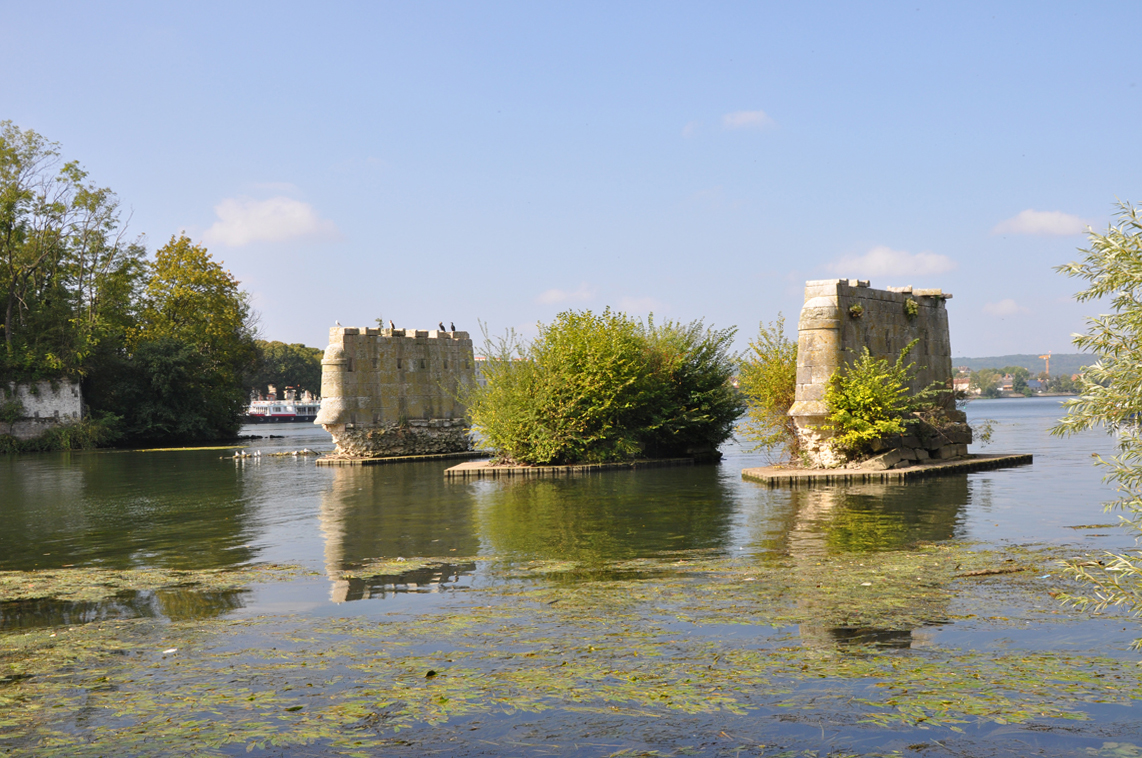
Medieval bridge

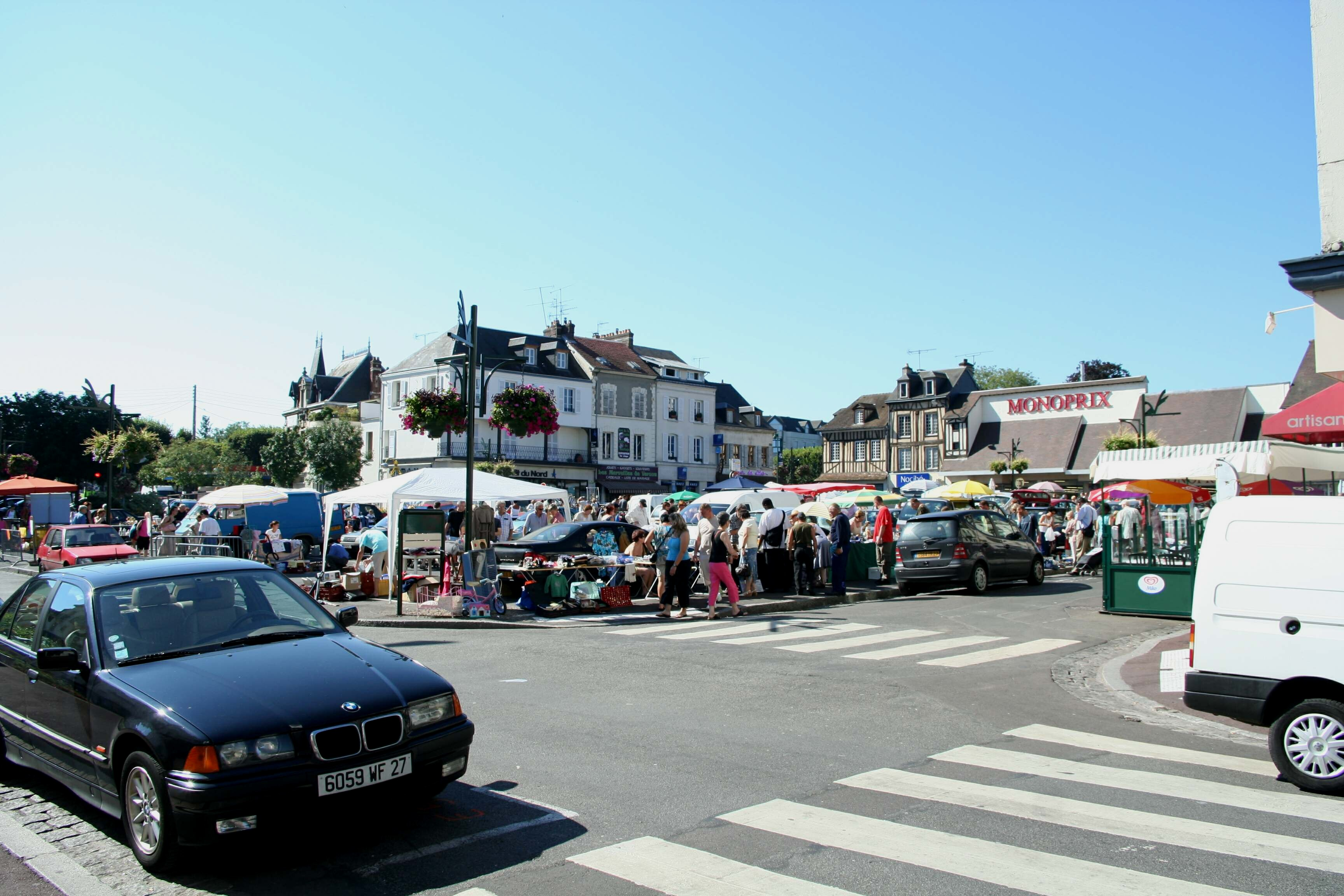
Place Charles de Gaulle's Market Day

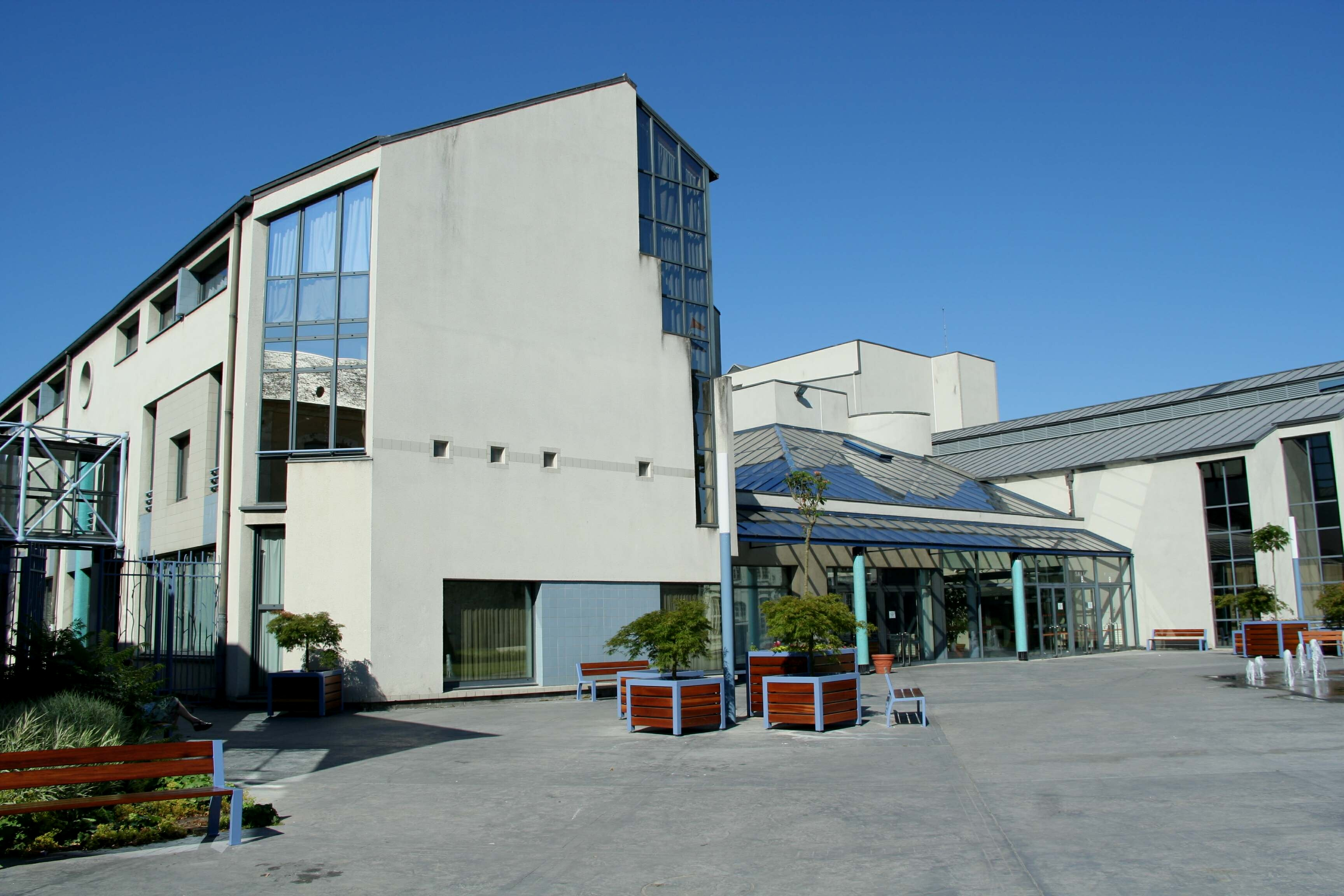
Espace Philippe-Auguste Culture Centre

== See also ==
- Communes of the Eure department
