= Maximus of Rome =

3rd-century Christian saint and martyr

Saint Maximus (died 250) was a Christian saint and martyr.

The emperor Decius published a decree ordering the veneration of busts of the deified emperors. Failure to pay homage to these idols would be considered high treason, prosecuted by torture and death. The merchant Maximus, originally from Asia, was called before the consul Optimus. Maximus provided his name, profession and identity as a Christian.

When Optimus ordered Maximus to "Sacrifice to save your life; if not I shall make you die in torment," Maximus answered, "I have always wished it; it is in order to pass out of this short and miserable life to the life eternal that I have declared my faith."

Maximus was tortured on the rack and by being beaten with rods, but because he would not recant, Optimus ordered him lapidated. Accordingly, on May 4, 250, Maximus was led outside the city walls and stoned to death.

Evidence for his story comes from an acta that is part of the "proconsular acts," a text created by the clerk of the tribunal of the Roman Catholic Church that established the martyrology.

His feast day in the Roman Catholic Church is April 30.
