= Uno Laht =

Estonian writer and poet

Uno Laht (April 30, 1924, in Valga, Estonia – September 24, 2008, in Tallinn) was an Estonian writer and poet who wrote about the characteristics of everyday Soviet life in poetry. Laht was also a NKVD (later KGB) officer who participated in arrests and deportations in the 1940s.

Laht also used the palindromic pseudonym Onu Thal.

Laht's humorous satires include the collections Piimahambad in 1954 ("Milk Teeth") and its second version Piimahambad (plombeeritud) in 1956 ("Milk Teeth, Filled"). The subject matter includes "shock troops" (work battalions sent to pioneer new agricultural and industrial collective projects), cultural restriction, time wasting bureaucracy and other phenomena of Soviet life. Laht has published several books, mostly satirical poetry and humor. In 1975, Laht was awarded the Tuglas Prize for his short story We Good Fellows All Over the Earth.

He has declared his political views changed at the restoration of the Estonian independence. He left the USSR Union of Writers and rejected the status of a Soviet war veteran.

Laht died on September 24, 2008, after a lengthy illness.
