= Adjutor =

12th-century French Catholic saint

Saint Adjutor
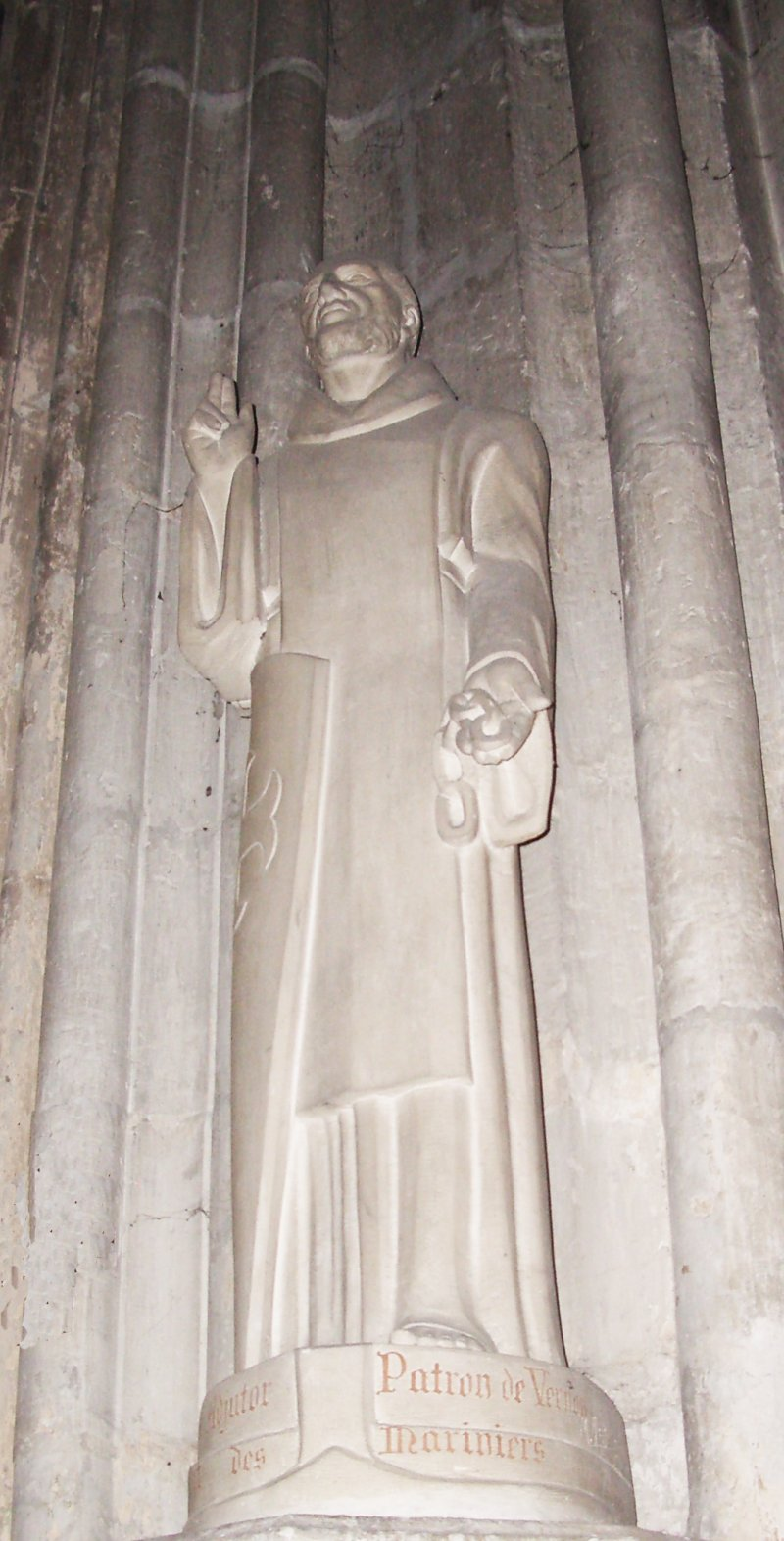
- Statue of St Adjutor at the collegiate church of Vernon, Eure

Confessor of the Faith
- Born: June 24, 1073; Vernon, France
- Died: April 30, 1131; Tiron, France
- Venerated in: Roman Catholic Church
- Feast: April 30
- Attributes: throwing his chains into a whirlpool
- Patronage: swimmers, boaters, drowning victims, Vernon

Adjutor (died April 30, 1131) is venerated as a saint by the Catholic Church. He is credited to be the patron saint of swimmers, boaters, and drowning victims, and the patron saint of Vernon, France. Adjutor was born in Vernon, France, on July 24, 1073, where he was made a knight in the First Crusade. The stories given for his patronage of boaters vary, though one common account was that Adjutor was captured by Muslims during the First Crusade, who tried to force him to abandon his faith, and when refusing, he escaped persecution by swimming. He swam back to France and entered the Abbey of Trion. There he became a recluse until his death on April 30.

Additional legends state that it was angels who freed Adjutor from his captors, and his association with the seas came when he calmed a whirlpool by throwing Holy water and the chains of his captivity into it, and signing the cross. In his later life he became a hermit.
