= Name of the Goths =

Topic in Germanic philology

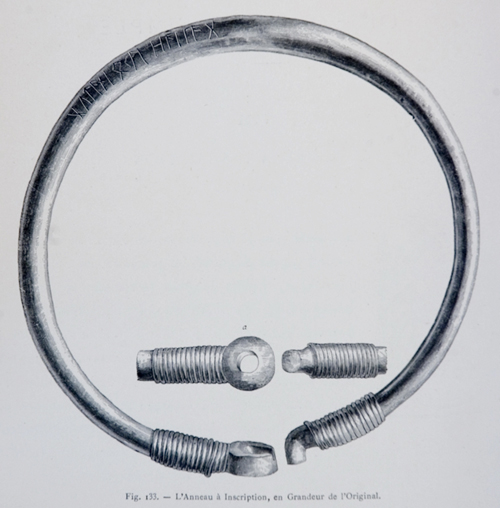
Runic inscriptions on the Ring of Pietroassa provides critical evidence on the name of the Goths.

The name of the Goths is one of the most discussed topics in Germanic philology. It is first recorded by Greco-Roman writers in the 3rd century AD, although names that are probably related appear earlier. Derived from Proto-Germanic *Gutōz ~ *Gutaniz, it is closely related to and probably means the same as the names of both the Geats of southern Sweden and Gutes of Gotland. The implications of these similarities, and the actual meaning of the Gothic name, are disputed in scholarship.

== Endonym and exonym ==
In the Gothic language, the Goths referred to themselves collectively as the *Gut-þiuda "Gothic people", attested as dative singular Gutþiudai. Gutthiuda could also mean "Land of the Gothic people".

The name of the Goths was probably first recorded by Greek and Roman writers as Gutones, an exonym referring to a people dwelling in the Vistula region during the 1st–2nd century AD. Gradually, forms written with "o" instead of "u", and "th" instead of simple "t", came to dominate in both Latin (e.g. Gothi) and Greek (γόθοι). Within medieval Germanic languages, the Goths are attested as Gotan (plural) in Old English and as Goti (singular) in Old Norse.

A Germanic an-stem variant of the name, *Gutan- (Goth), is inferred from a genitive plural form gutani, found on the Pietroassa inscription and possibly equivalent to Biblical Gothic Gutanē, and from the aforementioned Germano-Latin form Gutones ~ Gotones.

Another group of related ethnonyms is believed to be attested in Scandinavia, where the oldest forms of the name of the Geats were built from a root Gaut-. This could be an ablaut form of Gut-, although it has also been proposed that this was the normal stem corresponding to *Gutans, despite the different vowel.

== Etymology ==
The Proto-Germanic form of Goth is reconstructed as *Gutaz (pl. *Gutōz), which subsequently developed into Old English Gotan. The form *Gutaz was also borrowed into Proto-Baltic as *Gudaz, attested in the Old Prussian prefix gud- (in place names) and in the Lithuanian ethnonym Gùdas, meaning 'Polish' or 'Belarusian', here transferred to the peoples that supplanted the Goths south of their territory. These forms are identical to the reconstructed Proto-Germanic name of the Gutes (Old Norse pl. Gutar ~ Gotar < *Gutōz), a North Germanic tribe inhabiting the island of Gotland. Scholars have noted that Old Norse sources do not distinguish between Gutes and Goths.

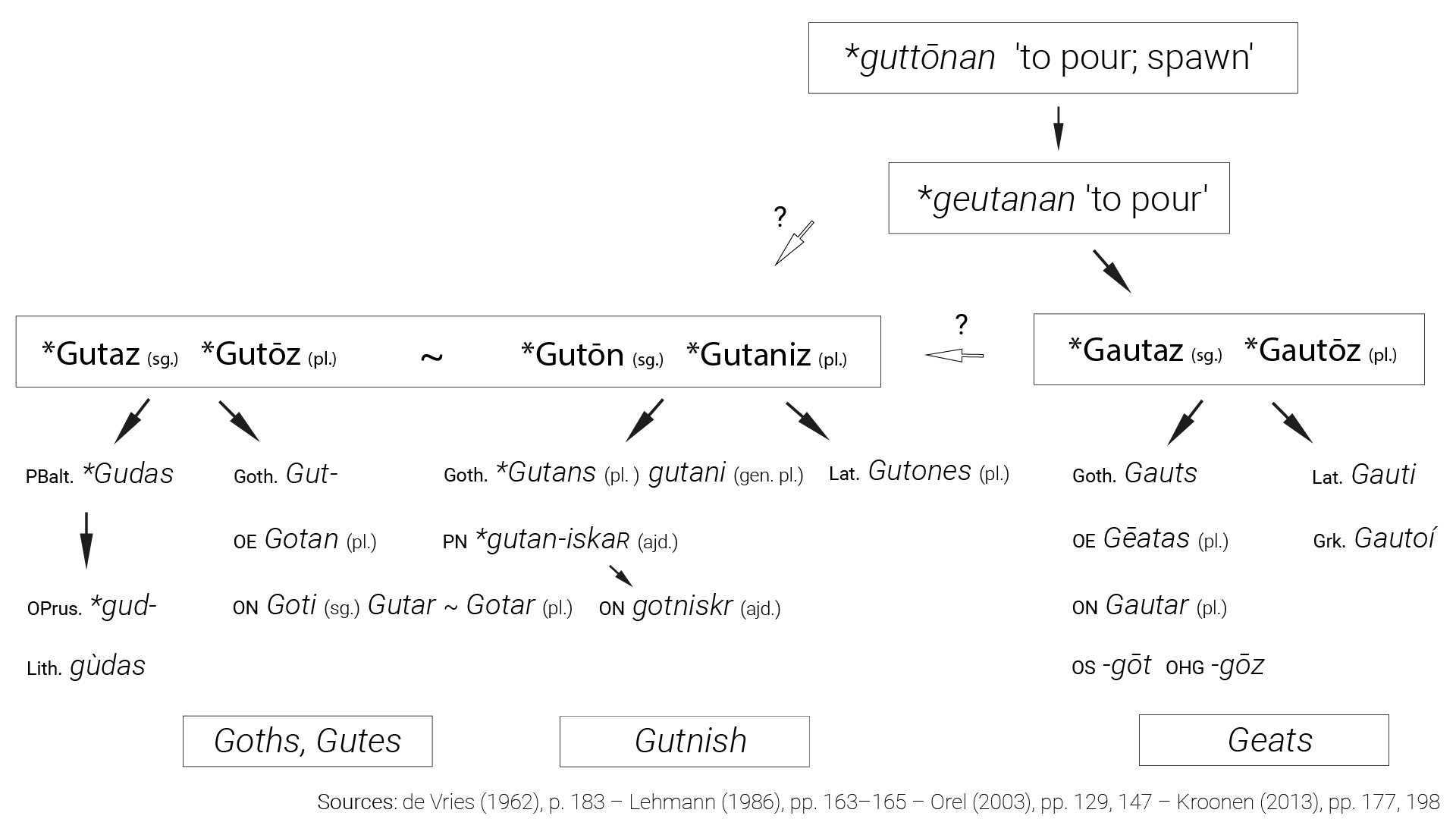
Etymology of the name 'Goth'

It co-existed with an an-stem variant *Gutō(n) (pl. *Gutaniz) observable in such forms as Gutones and gutani. The adjective gutniskr ~ gotniskr ('Gothic, Gutnish'), derived from an earlier *gutan-iskaʀ, along with the noun gutnar ~ gotnar ('men'), from an earlier *gutaniz, also give evidence of this an-stem formation.

The ethnonym Geats (or Gauts; Old Norse gautar) stems from Proto-Germanic *Gautōz (sg. *Gautaz), which shares the same etymology and possibly the same meaning as *Gutōz ~ *Gutaniz. The root gaut- is also preserved in several Swedish toponyms, such as the river Göta älv and the region Götaland (homeland of the Geats/Gauts), as well as in the mythic progenitor *Gaut (PGmc *Gautaz), attested by Jordanes as Gapt, whom he presents as an ancestor of the Goths. The root gut- may also be reflected in Guthalus, a river of Germania mentioned by Pliny the Elder, possibly meaning 'Gothic river'.

The roots gut- and gaut- are generally considered be related to the Proto-Germanic verb *geutanan, meaning 'to pour' (cf. Goth. giutan), itself derived from the Proto-Indo-European root *ǵʰewd- ('to pour'). It is not clear, however, whether the name *Gutaz stems from *Gautaz or the other way around, or whether both forms stem directly from *geutanan.

In any case, as Wolfram explains, the recurrence of this name among various groups does not necessarily imply large-scale migrations of a single unified people: "not entire peoples, but small successful clans, the bearers of prestigious traditions, emigrated and became the founders of new gentes".

== Meaning ==
Though the etymology of the Gothic name connects to words for pouring, its actual meaning remains uncertain. Various interpretations have been suggested: the pouring could refer to a river or a flooded homeland, the name could mean "people" in the sense of being "seed-spreaders" or "progenitors", or else refer to the name of an ancestor.

Wolfram interprets the Gothic name as meaning "men", and suggests that it might have meant "out-pourers" in the sense of "seed, the progenitors, the men". Some, including Peter Heather, have also suggested that Goths meant "the people". In Old Norse, Goti can mean "Goth" or "man", and gotnar signifies "men".

Another theory is to interpret Goths as the "seed-spreaders", hence the "stallions", "horses", or some other impregnating animal which may have been a deity. The term goti is used in Old Icelandic for "horse". The root gut- is also found in an Old Norse and later Scandinavian verbs meaning "to give birth". On this account, Icelandic linguist Ásgeir Blöndal Magnússon suggested that the Gothic name may have referred to those "born and bred" in the north.

As the word Goth is closely related to the Proto-Germanic verb "to pour", Anders Kaliff has favoured the idea that the Gothic name may mean "the people living where the river has their outlet" or "the people who are connected by the rivers and the sea".

Jordanes writes in Getica that the ancestor of the Goths was named Gapt (Proto-Germanic: *Gaut). In Scandinavia, Gaut was considered to be a manifestation of the Germanic god Odin, and the Geats derived their ethnonym from this name. The Geats and royal Lombards and Anglo-Saxons claimed descent from Gaut. Wolfram notes that the Gothic name may thus mean "sons of Gaut".

Regardless of the meaning of the Gothic name, Herwig Wolfram writes that it is certain that "the tribal name Goths means the same as Gauts". According to Wolfram, this is of bigger importance than its actual meaning. Elias Wessén writes that it is impossible to separate the words Gutar, Götar, Goths, *Gutans and Gauti from each other; they all mean the same.

== Attestations ==
The name of the Goths is generally believed to have been first attested by Greco-Roman writers in the 1st century AD in the form Gutones. This name was applied to peoples located near the lower Vistula. Herwig Wolfram suggests that Gutones may have meant "young" Goths or "great" Goths.

The Greek geographer Strabo mentions a people called the Butones (Greek: Βούτωνας), who came under the domination of the Marcomannic king Maroboduus. Most scholars believe this name should be corrected to Gutones (Greek: Γούτωνας). Thorsten Andersson, Peter Heather and Wolfram considers Strabo as the first writer to have mentioned the Gothic name.

Decades after Strabo, in his Natural History, Pliny the Elder mentions the Gutones as one of the peoples of Germania. In an earlier chapter, Pliny writes that the 4th century BC traveler Pytheas encountered a people called the Guiones in Germania. This name is often corrected to Gutones, but several other emendations have been proposed for the text of Pliny.

In the work Germania, published some years after Pliny, Tacitus mentions the Gotones/Gothones as one of the Germani. In a later work, The Annals, Tacitus again mentions the Gotones. The name Gotones/Gothones mentioned by Tacitus is generally considered the same as Gutones.

In his work Geography, the 2nd-century geographer Ptolemy mentions the Gutones/Gythones as one of the peoples of Sarmatia. He also mentions the Gutae/Gautae/Goutai of southern Scandia. The latter are variants of the name of the Geats and closely related to the name of the Goths.

After Ptolemy, the Gothic name is not attested again until the late 3rd century, when the name Goths (Latin: Gothi) is explicitly recorded for the first time for a group of peoples living north of the Danube. The Gothic name is attested in Shapur I's famous trilingual inscription at Naqsh-e Rostam, which is dated to 262. According to Shapur, "When first I was come to the imperial throne, Gordian Caesar (Gordian III) assembled a force of Goths and Germans from all of Rome and made an inroad into Assyria against the Aryan empire and us." The Middle Persian inscription is damaged at this point, but the Parthian reads Gvt (Goths) and the Greek Gouththon ("of Goths").

In 269 the Roman emperor Claudius II assumed the name Claudius Gothicus. No ancient sources make a connection between the names Gutones and Goths. Nevertheless, philologists and linguists have no doubt that these are the same names. Historian Arne Søby Christensen on the other hand argues that the similarities between the names are not significant. Historian Peter Heather has argued that while this similar name on its own could be an "accidental resemblance", there are other tribal names (specifically the Vandals and the Rugii) which similarly seem to appear first near present day Poland in the 1st century AD, only to reappear centuries later on the Roman frontiers far to the south.

A runic inscription on the Ring of Pietroassa can be read as Gutaniwiheilag, which is usually interpreted as 'the sacred heritage of the Goths'. The name Gutani probably reflects a form of the Gothic endonym *Gutans. Alternatively it reflects a form of the ethnonym of the Gutes.

The name of the Goths was directly borrowed from Gothic into Proto-Slavic as *gъtъ "Goth", "person from Gothland". Although the word was borrowed into Proto-Slavic, the word is attested only in East Slavic family; the oldest attestation is accusative plural g(ъ)ty recorded on an Old East Slavic gramota dated 1189. There was also form suffixed with -in: g(ъ)tinъ from 13-14th century and relational adjective *gъtьskъ attested as feminine gotьskyja in The Tale of Igor's Campaign and gotskoi beregъ "shore of Gotland".

== Legacy ==
The name Goths was sometimes applied also to several non-Gothic peoples, including Burgundians, Vandals, Gepids, Rugii, Sciri and even the non-Germanic Alans. Despite the scarce attestation of their languages, these peoples, with the exception of the Alans, are often referred to as East Germanic peoples. Herwig Wolfram has instead proposed that all these peoples still be referred to as Gothic peoples.

From the late 4th century, the region of Dacia in the Balkans came to be referred to as Gothia, as this region had fallen under the control of Goths. Within the Roman Empire the two major Gothic groups were the Visigoths and Ostrogoths. The Ostrogothic name is attested in Milan in 392, while the Visigothic name was invented by Cassiodorus centuries later, having earlier been simply Vesi. According to Wolfram, Visigoths means "the Good" or "the Noble" Goths, while Ostrogoths means "Goths of the rising sun" or "Goths glorified by the rising sun", i.e. "East Goths". The 6th century Frankish Table of Nations refers to Romanized Goths of Spain as Valagothi.

In the 6th century, Procopius and Jordanes mention the Gautoi and Gauthigoths of Scandia. These were probably Geats. Jordanes also writes that the area settled by the Goths under king Berig was still called Gothiscandza. This name means "Gothic-Scandia" or "Gothic coast".

In the 8th century, the area of Septimania in the Carolingian Empire was known as Gotia. This area had earlier been under the control of Visigoths. From the 8th to 10th century, a people called the Gothogreeks are mentioned as living in the western coast of Asia Minor. It is often suggested that the Spanish region Catalonia is a compound of Gothia-Alania, but this is probably not the case.

From the 12th century, art and architecture supposed to be lacking refinement were dismissed as being "Gothic". From the 15th century, the name had been appropriated for specific styles which are now known as Gothic art and Gothic architecture.

In the Russian Empire, the Lithuanians would refer to Russians pejoratively by the name Gudas (i.e. Gudes). This name is attested from the 16th century but is believed to be very old. Linguists have suggested that this is a vernacular name of the Goths. Connections have been proposed between this name and Gdynia and Gdańsk, but this is uncertain.

In the early twentieth century, the Danish philologist Gudmund Schütte advocated renaming the Germanic peoples to Gothonic peoples, because he considered the name of the Goths the earliest recorded Germanic ethnonym.

The Gothic name survives in the names of Götaland and Gotland, which according to Wolfram are "actual Gothic-Gautic names". In Spanish the Gothic name survives in the word godo, meaning 'noble' or 'rich'. In the Canary Islands, Chile, Bolivia, Cuba and Ecuador, it is or has been a pejorative for the Peninsulares (coming from the Spanish part of the Iberian Peninsula).

== Historical significance ==
The origin and meaning of the name of the Goths is often considered of great significance to research on the origins of the Goths. On the basis of name evidence, Piergiuseppe Scardigli writes that is impossible to deny that there was a relationship between the Geats and the Goths.

Based on the similarity between the Gothic name and those of the Gutes and Geats, scholars such as Wolfram have suggested that the Goths may have been an offshoot of either of these peoples. Wolfram means this not in a "biological" sense, but in the sense that "prestige bearing names" could be carried between groups of people.

Anders Kaliff and Ludwig Rübekeil suggest that the Goths, Gutes and Geats were rather all at one point part of the same community of merchant-warriors active on both sides of the Baltic Sea.

Ásgeir Blöndal Magnússon suggested that the name of the Goths, Gutes and Geats may originally have been applied to a northeastern Germanic group native to Scandinavia, who were distinguished from more southwesterly Celtic-influenced Germanic tribes known as Teutones. Such a distinction might be reflected in the conflicts between the Æsir and Vanir in Norse mythology. The Vanir were particularly revered in Sweden (see Yngvi and Freyr), while the Sagas record that Odin and the Æsir came to Scandinavia from the south. This supposed rift might be the reason why it has been difficult to document any common endonym among the early Germanic peoples.

== Other names ==
When mentioned by Greco-Roman scholars from the 3rd century AD, the Goths are frequently referred to as Scythians. Already in the first half of the third century, Dexippos, whose writing has only survived in fragments, referred to the Goths of his time as Scythians, although from the surviving fragments he did not necessarily intend to assert that they had common origins.

Starting in the 4th century authors such as Claudian, Orosius, Saint Jerome and Augustine of Hippo made a simpler equation between the Goths and the Getae, a tradition followed later by Cassiodorus, Jordanes and Isidore of Seville. However, modern historians have concluded that this equation is certainly incorrect.

In the late 4th century AD, Ambrose equated the Goths to Gog in the Book of Ezekiel, who was associated with barbarians from the north. Isidore of Seville later suggested that this proposal must have been assumed by previous authors because of the similarity in sound between "Gog" and "Goth".

== See also ==
- Gothic name
- Gothicism
- Götaland theory
- Name of the Franks
- Theodiscus
- Swedes (Germanic tribe)#Etymology
- Names of the Celts
- God (word)
- Gutian people
- Farfanes

== Notes and sources ==
=== Ancient sources ===
- Isidore of Seville (1970). History of the Kings of the Goths, Vandals, and Suevi. E.J. Brill.
- Jordanes (1908). The Origins and Deeds of the Goths. Translated by Mierow, Charles C. Princeton University Press.
- Pliny (1855). The Natural History. Translated by Bostock, John. Taylor & Francis.
- Procopius (1914). History of the Wars. Translated by Dewing, Henry Bronson. Heinemann.
- Ptolemy (1932). Geography. New York Public Library.
- Strabo (1924). The Geography. Translated by Jones, Horace Leonard. W. Heinemann.
- Tacitus (1876a). Germania. Translated by Church, Alfred John; Brodribb, William Jackson.
- Tacitus (1876b). The Annals. Translated by Church, Alfred John; Brodribb, William Jackson.

=== Modern sources ===
- Andersson, Thorsten (1996). "Göter, Goter, Gutar" [Geats, Goths, Gutes]. Namn og Bygd (in Swedish). 84: 5–21. ISSN 0077-2704.
- Andersson, Thorsten (1998b). "Goten: § 1. Namenkundliches". In Beck, Heinrich [in German]; Steuer, Heiko [in German]; Timpe, Dieter [in German] (eds.). Reallexikon der Germanischen Altertumskunde (in German). Vol. 12. De Gruyter. pp. 402–403. ISBN 3-11-016227-X.
- Brink, Stefan (2002). "Sociolinguistic Perspectives And Language Contact In Proto-Nordic". In Bandle, Oskar [in German] (ed.). The Nordic Languages. Vol. 1. Walter de Gruyter. pp. 685–690. ISBN 9783110148763.
- Brink, Stefan (2008). "People and Land in Early Scandinavia". In Garipzanov, Ildar H.; Geary, Patrick J.; Urbańczyk, Przemysław [in Polish] (eds.). Franks, Northmen, and Slavs. Cursor Mundi. Vol. 5. ISD. pp. 87–112. ISBN 9782503526157.
- Christensen, Arne Søby (2002). Cassiodorus, Jordanes and the History of the Goths: Studies in a Migration Myth. Translated by Flegal, Heidi. Museum Tusculanum Press. ISBN 87-7289-7104.
- de Vries, Jan (1962). Altnordisches Etymologisches Worterbuch (1977 ed.). Brill. ISBN 978-90-04-05436-3.
- Heather, Peter (1998). The Goths. Blackwell Publishing. ISBN 0-631-209-32-8.
- Heather, Peter (2010). Empires and Barbarians: The Fall of Rome and the Birth of Europe. Oxford University Press. ISBN 9780199892266.
- Homan, Roger (2006). The Art of the Sublime: Principles of Christian Art and Architecture. Ashgate Publishing. ISBN 0754650731.
- Heather, Peter (2018). "Goths". In Nicholson, Oliver (ed.). The Oxford Dictionary of Late Antiquity. Oxford University Press. p. 673. ISBN 9780191744457.
- Kaliff, Anders (2008). "The Goths and Scandinavia". In Biehl, P. F.; Rassamakin, Y. Ya. (eds.). Import and Imitation in Archaeology (PDF). Beier & Beran. pp. 223–243. ISBN 978-3-937517-95-7. Archived from the original (PDF) on March 4, 2020.
- Kristinsson, Axel (2010). Expansions: Competition and Conquest in Europe Since the Bronze Age. ReykjavíkurAkademían. ISBN 978-9979992219.
- Lehmann, Winfred Philipp (1986). A Gothic Etymological Dictionary. BRILL. ISBN 9004081763.
- Orel, Vladimir E. (2003). A Handbook of Germanic Etymology. Brill. ISBN 978-90-04-12875-0.
- Rübekeil, Ludwig (2002). "Scandinavia In The Light of Ancient Tradition". In Bandle, Oskar [in German] (ed.). The Nordic Languages. Vol. 1. Walter de Gruyter. pp. 593–604. ISBN 9783110148763.
- Scardigli, Piergiuseppe (2002). "Nordic-Gothic linguistic relations". In Bandle, Oskar [in German] (ed.). The Nordic Languages. Vol. 1. Walter de Gruyter. pp. 553–558. ISBN 9783110148763.
- Sławski, Franciszek, ed. (2001). Słownik prasłowiański (in Polish). Vol. 8: (goda – gyža). Wrocław: Ossolineum.
- Schütte, Gudmund (December 1912). "Gotthonic Names". Puclications of the Society for the Advancement of Scandinavian Study. 1 (3). Society for the Advancement of Scandinavian Study: 69–98. JSTOR 40914903.
- Sprengling, Martin (1940). "Shahpuhr I, the Great on the Kaabah of Zoroaster (KZ)". The American Journal of Semitic Languages and Literatures. 57 (4): 341–429. doi:10.1086/370585. S2CID 170471113.
- Strid, Jan Paul (January 2010). "The Origin of the Goths from a Topolinguistic Perspective: A Short Proposal". North-Western European Language Evolution. 58 (59). John Benjamins Publishing Company: 443–452. doi:10.1075/nowele.58-59.16str.
- Strid, Jan Paul (2011). "Retracing the Goths". In Kaliff, Anders; Munkhammar, Lars (eds.). Wulfila 311-2011 (PDF). Acta Universitatis Upsaliensis. pp. 41–54. ISBN 9789155486648. Archived from the original (PDF) on March 5, 2020.
- Wessén, Elias (1969). "Nordiska folkstammar och folknamn" [Nordic Tribes and Ethnonyms] (PDF). Fornvännen (in Swedish). 14. Royal Swedish Academy of Letters, History and Antiquities: 14–36. Archived from the original (PDF) on 2020-04-19.
- Wolfram, Herwig (1990). History of the Goths. Translated by Dunlap, Thomas J. University of California Press. ISBN 0520069838.
- Wolfram, Herwig (1997). The Roman Empire and Its Germanic Peoples. University of California Press. ISBN 978-0520085114.
- Wolfram, Herwig (2004). "Origo Gentis: The Literature of Germanic Origins". In Murdoch, Brian; Read, Malcolm (eds.). Early Germanic Literature and Culture. Boydell & Brewer. pp. 39–54. ISBN 157113199X.
