= Götaland theory =

Revisionist view that the foundation of Sweden occurred in Västergötland

The Götaland theory (or Westrogothian School, Swedish Västgötaskolan) is a conspiracy theory which claims that the foundation of Sweden occurred not in Eastern Sweden, but in the province of Västergötland (Westrogothia). Adherents use mediums to contact the dead in order to provide support for their theory, as well dowsing and etymology. They also claim that the established history consists of lies and forgeries. Although well known in Sweden and fervently preached by its adherents, it has never been accepted by scholars.

== History ==
The Götaland theory originated in the early 20th century with claims that the ancient city Ubsola (Uppsala) was situated in the province of Västergötland, specifically in the old lands called Uplanden. Additionally, the theory's supporters also held the view that Västergötland and the region of Lake Vänern was in fact the land of "Sithun", translated into modern day language as Sigtuna, where Odin and his Aesir companions supposedly settled when they came to Scandinavia.

An early predecessor of the theory was Pehr Tham (1737–1820), who during the 19th century unsuccessfully tried to promote ideas such as the village Sätuna being the location of Old Sigtuna, and the ancient town of Birka being situated somewhere around Lake Hornborga. He is regarded as a successor of Olof Rudbeckius, a seventeenth-century scholar who claimed that Sweden was the true location of the sunken Atlantis.

The early proponents of the Götaland theory proposed ideas about Västergötland, and the Vänern lake region, in particular, being the origin not only of the Geats, but also of the Suiones, the Danes; and furthermore the location of various phenomena in Norse mythology, such as Odin's Sithun (Sigtuna), Valhall, and the ash tree Yggdrasil. These ideas, created in the spirit of Romanticism, were also a reaction to the archaeological research at the time, which arguably neglected some areas of Sweden that were nevertheless rich in archaeological remains. The speculations of the adherents of the Götaland theory movement are largely irrelevant to modern academic discussion, which does not pay much attention to Swedish-Geatish wars or the Yngling kings.

Especially, the story of Odin and the Aesir's emigration according to the Ynglinga saga is generally considered as false by the official views and scholars. Other parts of the extensive work of Snorri Sturluson (and other saga writers) may however be considered valid references for finding elements of the ancient history of Scandinavian people and their religious customs and beliefs.

== Birka speculations ==
The town Birka is also known from the Vita Ansgari, in which Ansgar founds a mission in the town. It is commonly referred to being on Björkö island in the lake Mälaren. This location is a World Heritage Site and a popular tourist attraction.

According to the Västgöta theory, Birka as a name meant "merchant town," and could refer to any such town in ancient Sweden.

== Ubsola speculations ==
Upsalir, or Ubsola, was the main cult center of pagan (heathen) Ása-faith in ancient Scandinavia and Sweden. The ancient Upsalir was described by Adam of Bremen in the 11th century, and by Snorri Sturluson in the 13th century. It is generally considered to correspond to modern-day Uppsala, with its location on Uppsala's old location – Old Uppsala, in east Sweden, the habitat of the ancient tribe called Suiones (Swedes). The Västgöta school however claims that the original site for the temple was located in West Sweden, in the habitat of the ancient Geats (Götar), the tribe which came to name Västergötland.

There are however no archeological findings that support the view of Västergötland being the original site of Ubsola, and therefore the views of the Västgöta theory have little or no actual credibility.

== The theory's Nazi origin ==
The Götaland theory was the only notable result of the Nazi infiltration of Swedish archaeology during 1933–1945. Carl-Otto Fast, founder of the Westrogothian School ("Västgötaskolan"), was a known Nazi who some claim collaborated with SS Ahnenerbe, Richard Walther Darré and eugenicists from Hadamar in Germany. Archaeologist Magnus Alkarp, who has studied classified and semi-classified documents from the post-war era, has shown that the Westrogothian School was, among some regional, right-wing separatists movements in Scandinavia, an important part of the Operation Gladio.

== Testing the theory ==
Amateurs have unsuccessfully tried to prove what they consider important aspects of the Götaland theory several times. The barrow at Skalunda was claimed to be the burial site of the hero Beowulf known from the Beowulf epic; after applying the dowsing technique with a pendulum, they claimed that the barrow was indeed the burial site of this Geatish hero. Later, professional archaeologists drilled into the barrow to extract a sample for C14 dating. The barrow was from around 700 C.E., about 150 years too late for being a candidate for Beowulf's burial site.

The locality Sätuna at the Lake Hornborga in Västergötland was, according to believers in the theory, the true Sigtuna, where king Olof Skötkonung had his coins made. A protrusion in the ground was pointed out by adherents of the Götaland theory as the king's mint. However, when archaeologists examined it, the protrusion turned out to be the remains of an uncompleted barn from the 1890s.

== See also ==
- Lands of Sweden
- History of Sweden
- Gothicismus
- Name of the Goths
- Consolidation of Sweden
