= Abu-l-Hasan Ali ibn Ruburtayr =

12th century Catalan mercenary leader

Almohad troops either advancing towards the battle or returning from a raid on enemy territory with the booty.

Abu-l-Hasan Ali ibn Ruburtayr or Reverter (Arabic: أبو الحسن علي ابن رويبتر) (? – 1187 in El-Omra, Tounes) was the younger son of Reverter I viscount of Barcelona, and a Muslim Catalan mercenary commander. He left the Christian faith and territories, and converted to Islam. His Christian name is unknown.

When his father died in 1142 or 1144, he became leader of the Christian mercenary regiment of Tashfin ibn Ali, the Almoravid Sultan of Maghreb and Al-Andalus. In 1147, the Almoravid capital city, Marrakesh fell to the fanatical Almohads. The young Reverter decided then to embrace Islam and took an Arabic name.

The Christian mercenaries are sometimes accused of having let the Almohads enter the city in exchange for the Amān, a sacred safe conduct. The conversion of Reverter could support this thesis.

With the fall of the Almoravids, Reverter then served the Almohads. In 1183 the Sultan Yaqub al-Mansur sent him to Al-Mayurqa in order to take the island from the Banu Ghaniya, but he was captured by the Almoravid admiral Ali ibn Maymun, who was positioned against the Almohad rule. Ibn Ruburtayr managed to escape and to turn the island in favour of his master, until he placed a sovereign submitted to the Almohads on the throne. Then he left Al-Mayurqa and returned to Maghreb, where he was executed in 1187 after he fell at the hands of the Banu Ghaniya.

He is, besides Abu al-Mundhir, the only known case of a Muslim military commander of Catalan origin.

== Bibliography ==
- Barcelona, (1998) ed. 62, Diccionari d'Història de Catalunya
- Al-Qantara. Revista de Estudios Arabes, Sur le rôle des Almohades dans la fin du Christianisme local au Maghreb et en Al-Andalus, vol. 18, Robert Ignatius Molénat, 1997
- Guillem Rosselló Bordoy (1968), L'Islam a les Illes Balears (Ed. Daedalus)
