= 1144 =

1144 in various calendars
- Gregorian calendar: 1144; MCXLIV
- Ab urbe condita: 1897
- Armenian calendar: 593; ԹՎ ՇՂԳ
- Assyrian calendar: 5894
- Balinese saka calendar: 1065–1066
- Bengali calendar: 550–551
- Berber calendar: 2094
- English Regnal year: 9 Ste. 1 – 10 Ste. 1
- Buddhist calendar: 1688
- Burmese calendar: 506
- Byzantine calendar: 6652–6653
- Chinese calendar: 癸亥年 (Water Pig); 3841 or 3634 — to — 甲子年 (Wood Rat); 3842 or 3635
- Coptic calendar: 860–861
- Discordian calendar: 2310
- Ethiopian calendar: 1136–1137
- Hebrew calendar: 4904–4905
- Hindu calendars
- Vikram Samvat: 1200–1201
- Shaka Samvat: 1065–1066
- Kali Yuga: 4244–4245
- Holocene calendar: 11144
- Igbo calendar: 144–145
- Iranian calendar: 522–523
- Islamic calendar: 538–539
- Japanese calendar: Kōji 3 / Ten'yō 1 (天養元年)
- Javanese calendar: 1050–1051
- Julian calendar: 1144; MCXLIV
- Korean calendar: 3477
- Minguo calendar: 768 before ROC 民前768年
- Nanakshahi calendar: −324
- Seleucid era: 1455/1456 AG
- Thai solar calendar: 1686–1687
- Tibetan calendar: ཆུ་མོ་ཕག་ལོ་ (female Water-Boar); 1270 or 889 or 117 — to — ཤིང་ཕོ་བྱི་བ་ལོ་ (male Wood-Rat); 1271 or 890 or 118

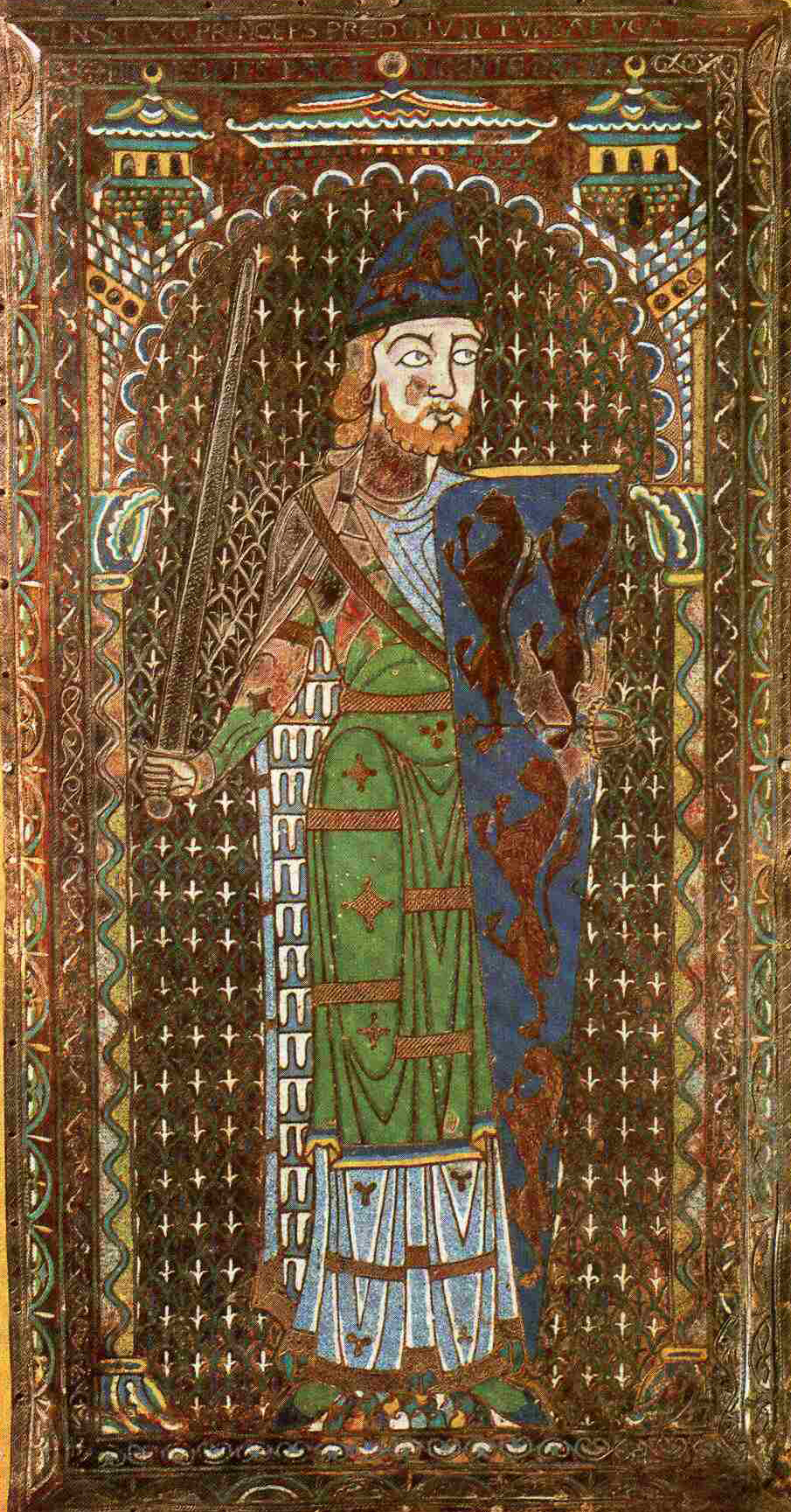
Geoffrey Plantagenet, Count of Anjou, becomes Duke of Normandy

Year 1144 (MCXLIV) was a leap year starting on Saturday of the Julian calendar.

== Events ==
=== By place ===
==== Levant ====
- Autumn – Imad al-Din Zengi, Seljuk governor (atabeg) of Mosul, attacks the Artuqid forces led by Kara Arslan – who has made an alliance with Joscelin II, count of Edessa. In support of the alliance Joscelin marches out of Edessa with a Crusader army down to the Euphrates River, to cut off Zengi's communications with Aleppo. Zengi is informed by Muslim observers at Harran of Joscelin's movements. He sends a detachment of Muslims to ambush the Crusaders and reaches Edessa with his main army in late November.
- December 24 – Siege of Edessa: Seljuk forces led by Imad al-Din Zengi conquer the fortress city of Edessa after a four-week siege. Thousands of inhabitants are massacred – only the Muslims are spared. The women and children are sold into slavery. This eliminates the Crusader principality of Outremer. Lacking the forces to take on Zengi, Joscelin II retires to his fortress at Turbessel. There, he requests reinforcements from the Byzantines and Queen-Regent Melisende of Jerusalem. This will lead to the Pope preaching a Second Crusade.
- 14-year old Baldwin III of Jerusalem quells a rebellion in Wadi Musa.

==== Europe ====
- Spring – Italo-Norman forces under King Roger II of Sicily invade the Papal States to force Pope Lucius II to accept his truce, but the patrician Giordano Pierleoni, brother of the late Antipope Anacletus II, leads the Roman populace to proclaim a constitutional republic free of papal authority with regard to civil rule. Pierleoni takes over the papal capital, and establishes the Commune of Rome in the style of the old Roman Republic.
- Summer – Geoffrey Plantagenet, Count of Anjou ("the Fair", husband of Empress Matilda) completes his conquest of Normandy, which comes under Angevin control. In exchange for being recognised as Duke of Normandy by King Louis VII of France, Geoffrey surrenders half of the county of Vexin – a region vital to Norman security – to Louis.
- The city of Montauban in southern France is founded by Count Alfonso Jordan of Toulouse.
- The city of Ljubljana (modern Slovenia) is first mentioned in historical records.

==== England ====
- Autumn – Geoffrey de Mandeville, 1st Earl of Essex, is mortally wounded by a stray arrow received in a skirmish. Because he is an outlaw, his burial is denied at the monastery he has founded, Walden Abbey. Geoffrey's body is eventually accepted by the Knights Templar community for burial within the Temple Church in London.

==== Africa ====
- Catalan mercenary Reverter de La Guardia, the main Almoravid commander in the Maghrid al-Aqsa, dies. His elimination opens the regions to the troops of the Almohads.

=== By topic ===
==== Religion ====
- March 8 – Pope Celestine II dies at Rome after a 5-month pontificate. He is succeeded by Lucius II as the 166th pope of the Catholic Church.
- March 22 – The first example of an anti-Semitic blood libel is recorded in England, in connection with the murder of William of Norwich.
- June 11 – The Basilica of St. Denis near Paris is completed, and consecrated in the presence of Louis VII – as the first Gothic church.
- The Lesmahagow Priory in Scotland, is founded after John, bishop of Glasgow, and King David I have granted lands at Lesmahagow.
- The first Knights Templar stronghold is established in the Kingdom of León and Castile.

== Births ==
- August 11 – Sinjong, Korean ruler of Goryeo (d. 1204)
- Li Fengniang, Chinese empress of the Song dynasty (d. 1200)
- Matsudono Motofusa, Japanese nobleman (d. 1230)
- Minamoto no Tomonaga, Japanese samurai (d. 1160)
- Taira no Tadanori, Japanese military leader (d. 1184)
- Approximate date – Maria Komnene, queen consort of Hungary and Croatia (d. 1190)

== Deaths ==
- March 8 – Celestine II, pope of the Catholic Church
- March 22 – William of Norwich, English child saint (b. 1132)
- May 23 – Petronilla of Lorraine, countess of Holland (b. 1082)
- June 12 – Al-Zamakhshari, Persian philosopher (b. 1075)
- July 17 – Abu Mansur Mauhub al-Jawaliqi, Arab philologist (b. 1074)
- July 27 – Salomea of Berg, High Duchess of Poland (b. 1099)
- September – Geoffrey de Mandeville, 1st Earl of Essex, English nobleman
- October 10 – Alfonso of Capua, Italo-Norman nobleman (b. 1120)
- December 24 – Hugh II (or Hugo), archbishop of Edessa
- Abu Tahir Marwazi, Persian philosopher and scientist
- Berenguer Ramon, Count of Provence, French nobleman (b. 1115)
- Matthew of Edessa (or Matteos), Armenian historian
- Rahere (or Raherius), Norman priest (approximate date)
- Reverter de La Guardia, viscount of Barcelona (or 1142)
- Zhu Bian, Chinese diplomat, poet and writer (b. 1085)
