= Stefan Brink =

Swedish philologist (born 1952)

- Born: 1952 (age 73–74)
- Title: Professor

Academic background
- Education: Uppsala University

Academic work
- Discipline: Philology
- Institutions: University of Cambridge

Stefan Brink (born 1952) is a Swedish philologist affiliated with the Department of Anglo-Saxon, Norse and Celtic, University of Cambridge.

== Biography ==
Stefan Brink received his PhD in Nordic languages from Uppsala University in 1990. He was made a docent at Uppsala University in 1991, specializing in toponymy. He has been a visiting professor at Harvard University, the University of California, Los Angeles, Aarhus University and the University of Bergen. He is an Honorary Research Associate at the Department of Anglo-Saxon, Norse and Celtic, University of Cambridge and formerly the Sixth Century Chair of Scandinavian Studies at the University of Aberdeen.

Brink is the editor of the journals Viking and Medieval Scandinavia and the academic series Acta Scandinavica. He is a member of the Royal Gustavus Adolphus Academy, the Royal Swedish Academy of Letters, History and Antiquities and the Royal Society of Edinburgh.

== See also ==
- Thorsten Andersson
