= Viscounty of Barcelona =

The viscounty of Barcelona was an office in the medieval County of Barcelona. The viscounts exercised the count's authority in the city of Barcelona itself.

== History ==
In the Carolingian era, the viscounts were general representatives of the count throughout the county, but their power was not well defined or clearly distinguished from that of the count's vicars, who generally exercised comital authority of a more limited remit. By the late 10th century, the viscounts exercised comital authority over the city of Barcelona itself. In 974 and 976, Viscount Guitard participated in two embassies to the court of the Caliphate of Córdoba on behalf of the count of Barcelona. In 985, Guitard was succeeded by his Udalard I, who led the defence of Barcelona against Almanzor's attack later that year. Thereafter, the office of viscount was hereditary in a their family, which cemented its place in the high aristocracy by marriages with the count's family.

The viscounts controlled the fortified castle-gates of Castellnou and Castellvell in the walls of Barcelona. Their private base of power in the city was the ownership of some workshops and ovens. Their base outside of the city was the castle of La Guàrdia de Montserrat. They also held the surrounding castles of Cabrera, Apiera, Castellet, Apierola and Castellolí.

In the 1040s, the Viscount Udalard II and his uncle, Bishop Guislabert rebelled against the authority of Count Ramon Berenguer I. They attacked the count's palace in the city, killing one of his men. By 1046, they had been forced to submit but were not deprived of office. In a judgement, Udalard was forced to take an oath of fealty as the relationship between count and viscount was feudalized. In 1063, Udalard was required to get the count's approval before appointing castellans.

The earliest reference to a court jester in Catalonia is found in a 1088 charter of the viscount. Over the following decades, the power of the viscounts declined as that of the vicars rose. By the early 12th century, the vicecomital family had sold off most of its property in Barcelona and finally, with the approval of the count, sold the vicecomital rights themselves to the vicars. After 1145, Castellvell, the traditional hub of vicecomital authority in the city, was controlled by the vicars. In 1155, Viscount Reverter sold his family's last possession in the city, some ovens and stalls near Castellvell. The title of viscount of Barcelona disappears from the records after that.

== Powers ==
The viscounts exercised justice in the city, held command of its defences and were responsible for managing the comital fisc. In 1025, Count Berenguer Ramon I confirmed that citizens of Barcelona could take their cases before the viscount or judges delegated by him.

Traditionally, the public authority of the viscount, delegated by the count, is seen as merging with or being supplanted by private power, hereditary and based on land and castles. In the mid-11th century, the counts sought to curb power of the viscounts and reassert their authority. In 1058, Udalard II recognized that he held Castellvell not as a private possession but in fief from the count and lifted all the various tolls he had imposed at the gate.

== List of viscounts ==
- Sunifred (c. 858)
- Ermenard (c. 918)
- Guitard (c. 966–985)
- Udalard I (985–1014), son
  - Geribert (985–), brother, regent
- Ermengarda (1014–1063), daughter of Udalard I
- Bernat de Santmartí (1014–?), married with Ermengarda
  - Guislabert I, son of Udalard I, bishop of Barcelona and regent
- Udalard II (1063–1076), son of Ermengarda
- Guislabert II (1076–1126), son
- Reverter (1126–1142), son

== Sources ==
- Bensch, Stephen P. (1995). Barcelona and its Rulers, 1096–1291. Cambridge University Press.
