= Piergiuseppe Scardigli =

Italian medievalist and Germanic studies scholar

- Born: 13 October 1933; Altopascio, province of Lucca
- Died: 27 May 2008 (aged 74)

Academic work
- Discipline: Medieval studies; Germanic studies
- Institutions: University of Florence

Piergiuseppe Scardigli (13 October 1933 - 27 May 2008) was an Italian medievalist and Germanic studies scholar. He was Professor of Germanic philology at the University of Florence. Scardigli specialized in the study early Germanic culture, literature and language.

== Selected works ==
- Lingua e storia dei Goti, 1964
