= Anders Kaliff =

Swedish archaeologist (born 1963)

- Born: 1963 (age 62–63)

Academic work
- Discipline: Archaeology
- Institutions: Uppsala University

Anders Kaliff (born 1963) is a Swedish archaeologist. Kaliff has worked as chief of the archaeology department of the Swedish National Heritage Board, and led archaeological excavations throughout Northern Europe and Asia. Since 2008 he has been Professor of Archaeology at Uppsala University. Kaliff is a member of the Royal Gustavus Adolphus Academy and the Nathan Söderblom Society.

== Selected works ==
- Grav och kultplats, 1997
- Gothic Connections, 2001
- Dracula och hans arv, 2009
- Fire, Water, Heaven and Earth, 2011
- Källan på botten av tidens brunn, 2018
