= Ali ibn Maymun =

ʿAlī ibn Maymūn ibn Abī Bakr al-Idrīsī al-Mag̲h̲ribī (Arabic: علي بن ميمون بن أبي بكر الإدريسي; 1450–1511) (full name: Abu al-Hasan ʿAli ibn Maymūn ibn Abī Bakr ibn ʿAli ibn Maymūn al-Hashimi al-Qurashi al-Maghribi al-Ghumari al-Fasi Al-Maliki), also known as Shaykh 'Ali ibn Maymun, was a Moroccan ālim and Sufi mystic of Berber origin, but he pretended to be from an Alid origin, which increased his reputation.

== Biography ==
=== Early life ===
He was born in the region of Ghumara (north Morocco) around 1450, he studied Islamic sciences locally, then in Fez, from 1471. He held the office of qāḍī in Chefchaouen for a period of ten years (890–900). In his youth he is said to have been the amīr of the Banu Rashid tribe in the Jabal Ghumara, but to have relinquished that position because he was unable to enforce among his people the prohibition on wine-drinking.

=== Religious life ===
In 901/1495-6 he left Fez, visited Damascus, Mecca, Aleppo, and Bursa, and finally settled at Damascus where he died in 917/1511.

== Works ==
His mysticism was of a moderate character; in his Bayān ghurbat al-Islām bi-wāsiṭat ṣinfayn min al-mutafaqqihah wa 'l-Mutafaqqirah min Ahl Miṣr wa 'l-Shām wa-mā yalīhumā min bilād al-a‘jām (Elucidation of the Abandonment of Islam on the Part of those who Claim to be Legal Scholars and those who Claim to be Sufis, from among the People of Egypt and Syria and those Foreign Lands around them), he inveighed against the religious and social abuses which he had noticed in the east. He wrote this work at an advanced age (he commenced it on 19 Muharram 916).
