= Lake Hornborga =

Lake in Västergötland, Sweden

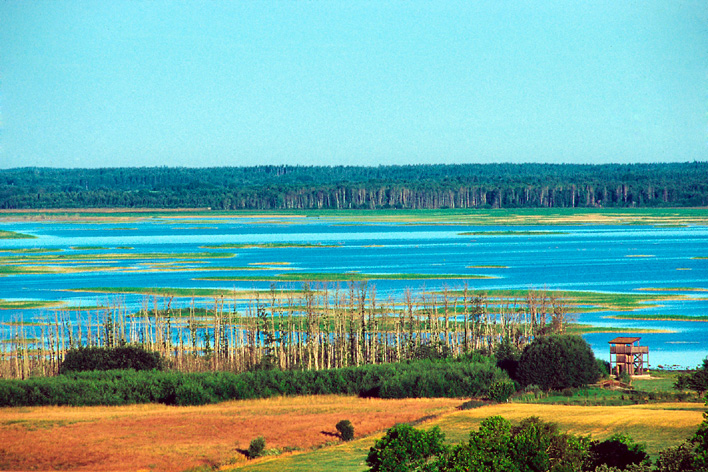

- Location within Västra Götaland
- Location: Västergötland
- Coordinates: 58°19′N 13°33′E
- Basin countries: Sweden
- Surface area: 28 km^{2} (11 sq mi)
- Max. depth: 2 m (6 ft 7 in)

Ramsar Wetland
- Official name: Hornborgasjön
- Designated: 5 December 1974
- Reference no.: 22

Lake Hornborga (Swedish: Hornborgasjön) is a lake in Västergötland in Sweden, famous for its many birds, in particular the many cranes that stay there temporarily during their annual migrations. The lake has an area of 28 square kilometers.

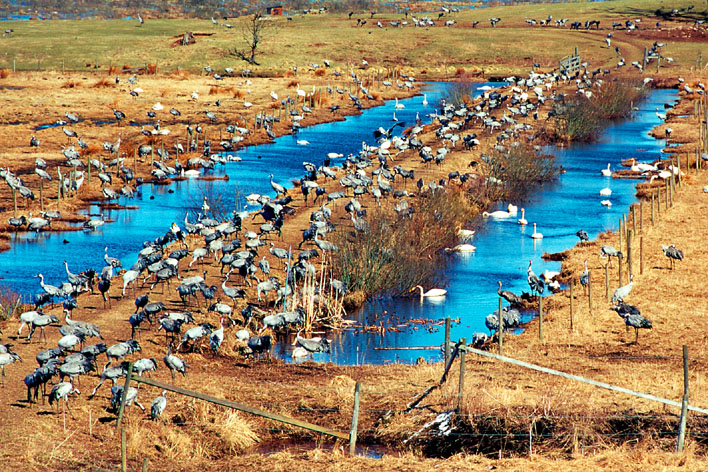
Common crane at Hornborgasjön

== History ==
Lake Hornborga was created after the last ice age, approximately 10,000 years ago. The area has been settled since the Stone Age.

In order to relieve starvation, it was decided in 1802 to lower the water level in order to create pastures for cattle to graze. The water level was lowered a further four times after this. The surface area was reduced from 28 km^{2} to less than 4 km^{2}, but rather than make way for pastures, reeds took over and turned the lake into a swamp. Throughout these reductions, the lake remained a popular habitat for birds, but the last reductions in 1933 also reduced its attraction for birdlife. In 1965, a Government investigation suggested that the lake be restored, and between 1992 and 1995, the water level increased by an average of 0.9 metres. During the restoration, 1,200 hectares of reed and 800 hectares of trees were removed, and animals were reintroduced to graze the shores of the lake.
