= Farfanes =

Class of soldiers in the later Middle Ages

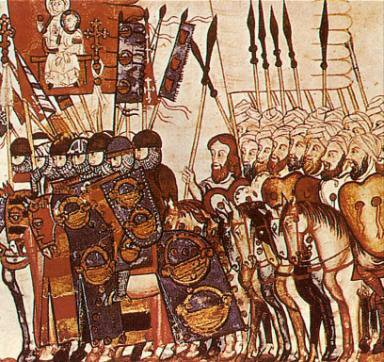
A miniature from the Cantigas de Santa Maria depicting a farfan unit under the banner of the Virgin in the army of the Almohad Umar al-Murtada during the battle of Marrakesh against the Marinid Abū Yūsuf in 1262.

Farfanes (sing. farfan) were soldiers hailing mostly from the Christian Iberian kingdoms in the later Middle Ages fighting as mercenaries for the various Muslim dynasties of the Western Mediterranean. Farfanes fought in the European fashion, in dense formations of either heavy cavalry or infantry under the command of a Christian European officer, the qadi. The phenomenon came to an end when Christian mercenaries were repatriated in the 15th century. The patronym "Farfán" is still relatively common in 21st-century Spanish-speaking countries and may be linked to these families which came back from the Maghreb.

== Etymology ==
The origin of the word "farfan" is unclear, but it may be cognate with the Arabic word farkhan meaning bird. A hypothesis is that this word was commonly given to vagabonds in the Maghreb who were regarded as migratory like birds. By extension, the word farkhan came to refer in the vernacular language to bastards, criminals, and outcasts.

== Origins ==
The use of foreign mercenaries was widespread in the medieval Mediterranean world and mercenary units were common in Muslim, Byzantine and Papal armies. Muslim armies, in particular, relied regularly on non-Muslim or recently Islamicized warriors such as Turks and sub-Saharan Africans. The existence of the farfanes is thus in no way exceptional. However, the actual origins of the farfan units remain undetermined. Three scenarios are usually mentioned by historians (which are not mutually exclusive).

The farfans may be considered to be a continuation of the complex network of alliances common in 10th-century Iberia. Muslim leaders commonly used units lent to them by their Christian allies or formed their own units with individuals exiled from Christian lands. These types of arrangements are well known due to the fame of El Cid, and as it was widespread in al-Andalus, it is possible that this habit was passed on to the other side of the Mediterranean in the 12th century.

According to another theory, the farfan units in North Africa were originally Christian slaves and prisoners of war held by the Almoravid dynasty after its successful offensives against the Christians in Iberia. Units composed entirely of slaves or recently-freed men were relatively common both in North Africa and in al-Andalus, so this theory of the origin of the farfan fits an observable pattern. The history of Reverter de La Guardia, a Catalan nobleman captured by the Almoravid army on a Spanish battlefield in the 1120s, is one of the earliest examples of a Christian mercenary fighting in North Africa and would support this scenario.

The third theory is related to the mass deportation of the Mozarab Christians from al-Andalus to North Africa in 1126 by the Almoravids. Once in the hostile Maghrebi environment, the Mozarabs would have had little choice but to seek the support of the Almoravid rulers and to enlist as soldiers in their armies. This alternative fits with the tribal designation of the farfans sometimes called Banu Farfan in the sources. The surname "Farfán de los Godos", may indicate a Gothic origin.

== Famous farfanes ==
- Peter I, Count of Urgell
- Pedro Ruiz de Azagra
- Reverter de La Guardia
- Álvaro Núñez de Lara
- Rodrigo Díaz de Vivar, (El Cid)
- Alonso Pérez de Guzmán, el Bueno
- Enrique de Castilla
- Geraldo Sem-Pavor
- Guillermo de Moncada
- Raymundo de Garriga
- Raymond du Busquet
- Federico Lancia
- Fadrique de Castilla
- Guillermo-Raymundo de Moncada
- Napoleon de Aragón
- Federico di Sicilia
- Guglielmo Morchio
- Guillermo Galcerán
- Berenger de Cardona
- Jaume Garics
- Guerau de Queralt
- Lodorico Alvares
- Andreuccio Cibo
- Guglielmo Cibo
- Alvero Benisituf
- Anton Navara
- Garci Gómez Carillo
