= Jan Paul Strid =

Swedish toponymist (1947–2018)

- Born: July 15, 1947
- Died: December 25, 2018 (aged 71); Linköping, Sweden

Academic work
- Discipline: Toponymy
- Institutions: Linköping University

Jan Paul Strid (July 15, 1947 – December 25, 2018) was a Swedish toponymist who was Professor of Linguistics at Linköping University.

== Biography ==
Strid received his PhD in Nordic languages from Stockholm University in 1981, where he was made a docent in 1982. Since 2002, Strid was Professor of Linguistics at Linköping University. Strid was a well known authority on Swedish place names. He was a regular guest as an expert on linguistics on Sveriges Radio. In 2006, Strid won the prestigious Cnattingius Prize for his pioneering research on the history and culture of Östergötland. He died in Linköping on December 25, 2019.

== Selected works ==
- Runestones, 1991
- Från Mumsmålen till Duvemåla, 2006
- Kulturlandskapets språkliga dimension, 1999
- Tindra: ett landskap i tidens spegel, 2009
