= Skalunda =

Village and archaeological site in Sweden

Coordinates: 58°33′N 12°59′E

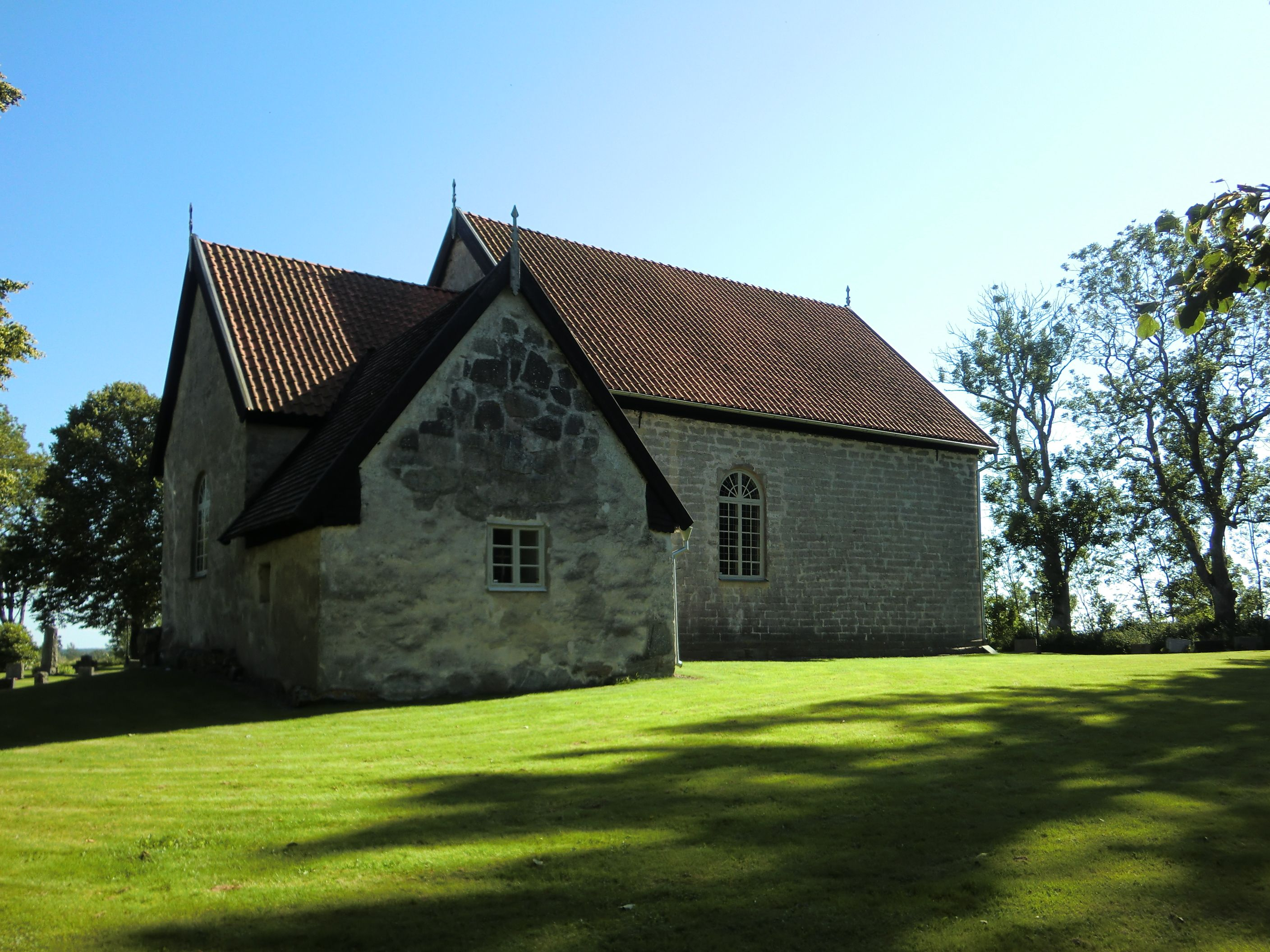
Skalunda Church (Skalunda kyrka)

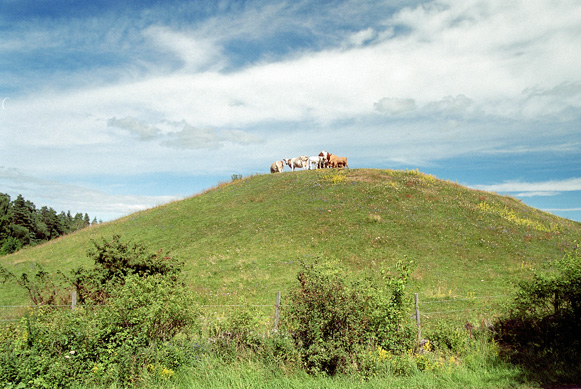
Skalunda Barrow (Skalunda hög)

Skalunda is a village at Lidköping Municipality in Västergötland, Sweden. Skalunda was an important location dating to the Iron Age and was one of the eight royal estates of early medieval Västergötland (cf. Uppsala öd).

Skalunda is the site of Skalunda Church dating to the during Middle Ages. At Skalunda there are also several ancient remains, including the site of Skalunda Barrow, a historic burial mound.

== Skalunda Church ==
Skalunda Church (Skalunda kyrka) was built in the 12th century. The Romanesque church is commonly believed to have originated as a mission church. The towerless church was built of finely hewn sandstone blocks. Arches were built in the 15th century and at the end of the 19th century were taken down. The belfry was built in 1772 and has two church bells dating from the Middle Ages; the smaller church bells from early 13th century, the larger church bell was cast in 1533.

== Skalunda Barrow ==
To the west of Skalunda Church is Skalunda Barrow (Skalunda hög). It measures 65 metres across and it is 7 metres high. The burial mound has not yet been excavated, but C14 surveys from the ground have dated it to the beginning of the 6th century. Next to the barrow there is a stone circle consisting of seven circularstones.

Swedish philologist, archaeologist and historian Birger Nerman (1888-1971) director of the Swedish Museum of National Antiquities, suggested Skalunda Barrow to be a likely burial site of the hero Beowulf, a legendary Geatish king.

== Other sources ==
- Burström, Mats: (1996) Skalunda hög, historier kring en hög Mellan bronssköld och JAS-plan. Glimtar av Lidköpingsbygdens historia. pages 79–92.
- Ewald, Gustaf: (1950) Är Skalunda hög kung Beowulfs grav? Västgöta-Bygden nr 1, pages 335–336. (Om *Birger Nermans och °Carl Otto Fasts idéer angående hednatima kungars gravplats.)
- Flink, G.: (1986) Landet mellan Larva Bäsing och Skalundahögen Arkeologi i Sverige 1982–3.
- Nerman, B.: (1956) När kom Västergötland under svearnas välde? Västergötlands fornminnesförenings tidskrift
- Svärdström, Elisabeth: (1958–1970) Västergötlands runinskrifter
- Thorstensson, Gunnar: (1996) Skalundahögen Västgötabygden, tidskrift för hembygdsarbete, natur- och kulturminnesvård. Västergötlands hembygdsförbund . Sid 10–11.
