= Reverter (viscount) =

Catalan adventurer and military leader (died 1142/44)

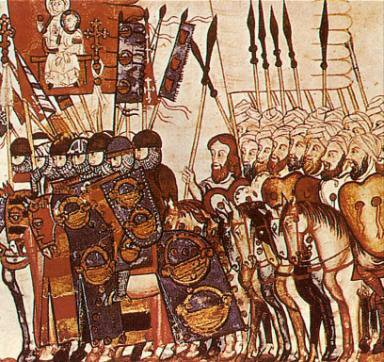
A miniature from Cantiga de Santa Maria 181 depicting a Moroccan army with a Christian Banner at the battle of Marrakesh between Umar al-Murtada and Abū Yūsuf, emir of Benimerines.

Reverter (died 1142 or 1144), viscount of Barcelona, was a Catalan adventurer and military leader who defended the Almoravid caliphate in North Africa against the Almohad onslaught.

He was the son of Guislabert II, viscount of Barcelona, a title, which at that time, had lost much of its prestige. He married a woman known as Ermesindis and had several sons with her. During his long absence from the county, his nephew, Guillem, appears to have ruled in his name over his estates.

As a feudatory of the count of Barcelona, he is believed to have been captured by the Almoravids during a battle along the Ebro river in the 1120s, probably 1126. He remained a prisoner of war in North Africa for about a decade until the emergence of the Almohad threat in the Maghrib al-Aqsa induced the emir, Ali ibn Yusuf, to levy a troop of mercenaries among the captive Spanish soldiers (c.1132). Reverter agreed to lead this force, with the express permission of the count of Barcelona.

Reverter and his Christian mercenaries appear to have been very successful at stemming the advance of the Almohads for several years. The Catalan knight may even have been entrusted with the command of the entire Almoravid army but he was killed in battle in 1142 or 1144, possibly near Tlemcen, and his corpse was crucified by the Zenatas. After his death, the Almoravid emirate crumbled rapidly. Two of his sons seem to have fought alongside Reverter in the armies of the caliph. Berenguer became the new viscount at the death of his father and returned in Spain and Abu-l-Hasan who took the command of the Christian contingent before converting to Islam.

== See also ==
- El Cid
- Gerald the Fearless
- Robert Crispin
- Farfanes: name of the Christian mercenaries at the service of Moorish kings.
