= Thorsten Andersson =

Swedish toponymist

- Born: 23 February 1929; Ödeshög Municipality, Sweden
- Died: 22 April 2018 (aged 89); Uppsala, Sweden

Academic work
- Discipline: Toponymy
- Institutions: University of Münster; Uppsala University

Karl Thorsten Gunnar Andersson (23 February 1929 – 4 April 2018) was a Swedish toponymist, and a former professor of linguistics at Uppsala University.

== Biography ==
Karl Thorsten Gunnar Andersson was born in Ödeshög Municipality, Sweden on 23 February 1929. He was an associate professor of Swedish at the University of Münster from 1957 to 1960. Andersson received his PhD from Uppsala University in 1965, where he subsequently became a docent in Nordic languages. From 1971 to 1994, Andersson was Professor of Linguistics at Uppsala University.

Andersson specialized in toponymy. He was the publisher of Namn och bygd and co-publisher of Studia Anthroponymica Scandinavica. He was the author of a large number of books and articles on Swedish place names and personal names. Andersson was a member of the Royal Society of the Humanities at Uppsala, the Royal Gustavus Adolphus Academy, the Royal Danish Academy of Sciences and Letters, the Royal Swedish Academy of Letters, History and Antiquities and the Royal Norwegian Society of Sciences and Letters. He died on 4 April 2018.

== Selected works ==
- Svenska häradsnamn, 1965
- Namn i Norden och det forna Europa, 1989
