= 1279 =

1279 in various calendars
- Gregorian calendar: 1279; MCCLXXIX
- Ab urbe condita: 2032
- Armenian calendar: 728; ԹՎ ՉԻԸ
- Assyrian calendar: 6029
- Balinese saka calendar: 1200–1201
- Bengali calendar: 685–686
- Berber calendar: 2229
- English Regnal year: 7 Edw. 1 – 8 Edw. 1
- Buddhist calendar: 1823
- Burmese calendar: 641
- Byzantine calendar: 6787–6788
- Chinese calendar: 戊寅年 (Earth Tiger); 3976 or 3769 — to — 己卯年 (Earth Rabbit); 3977 or 3770
- Coptic calendar: 995–996
- Discordian calendar: 2445
- Ethiopian calendar: 1271–1272
- Hebrew calendar: 5039–5040
- Hindu calendars
- Vikram Samvat: 1335–1336
- Shaka Samvat: 1200–1201
- Kali Yuga: 4379–4380
- Holocene calendar: 11279
- Igbo calendar: 279–280
- Iranian calendar: 657–658
- Islamic calendar: 677–678
- Japanese calendar: Kōan 2 (弘安２年)
- Javanese calendar: 1189–1190
- Julian calendar: 1279; MCCLXXIX
- Korean calendar: 3612
- Minguo calendar: 633 before ROC 民前633年
- Nanakshahi calendar: −189
- Thai solar calendar: 1821–1822
- Tibetan calendar: ས་ཕོ་སྟག་ལོ་ (male Earth-Tiger); 1405 or 1024 or 252 — to — ས་མོ་ཡོས་ལོ་ (female Earth-Hare); 1406 or 1025 or 253

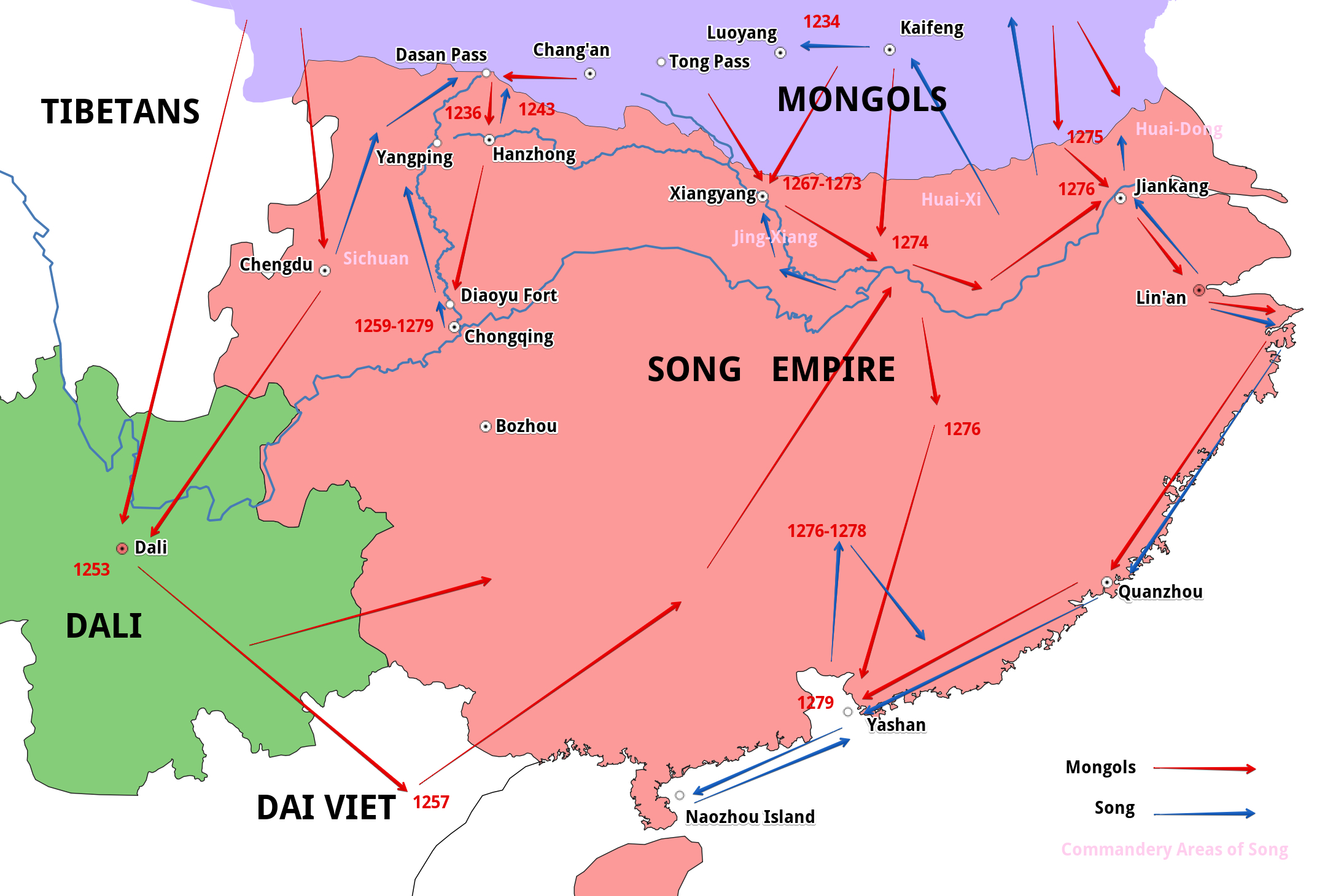
Mongol invasion of the Song dynasty in Northern and Southern China (1234–79)

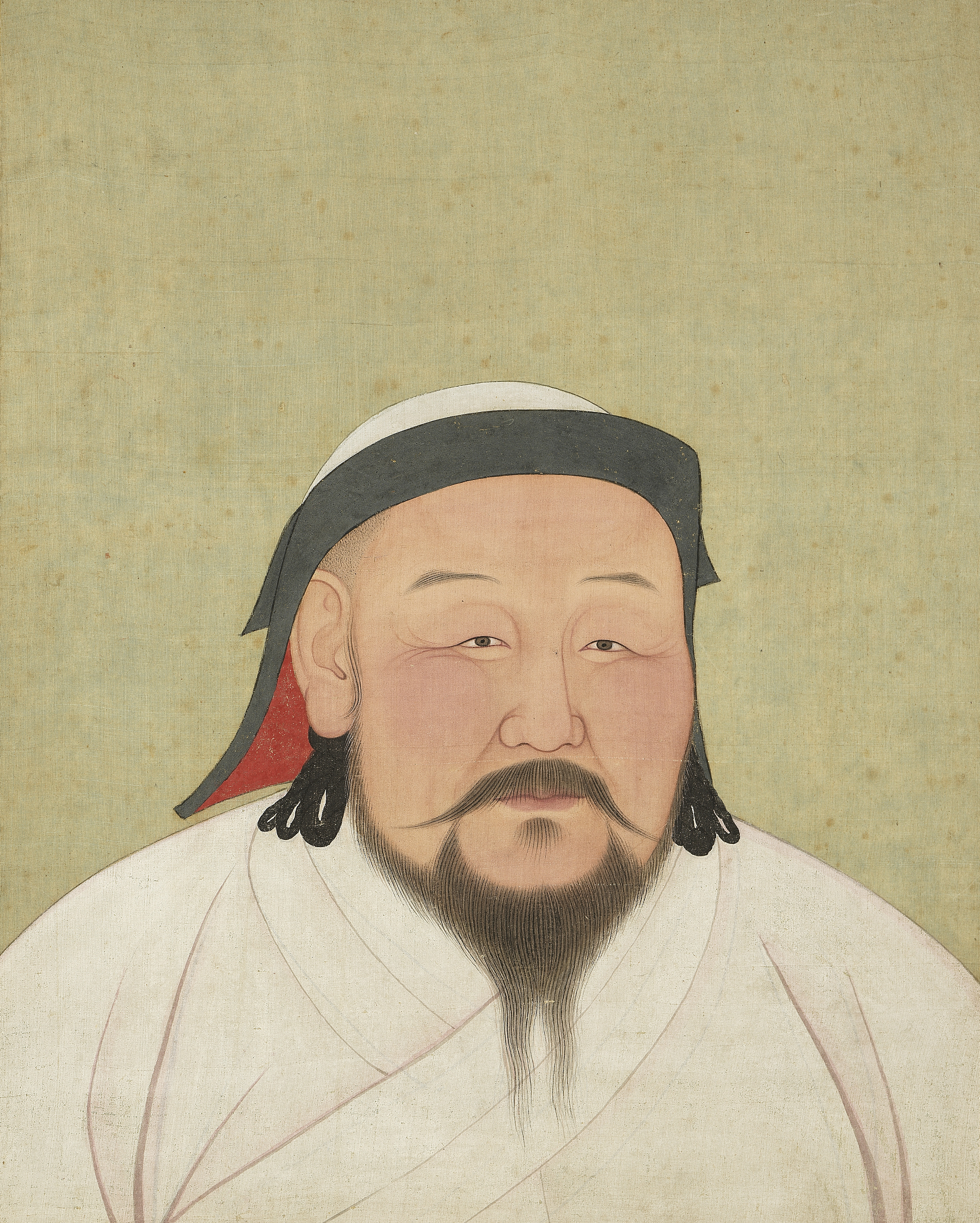
Portrait of Kublai Khan (1215–1294)

Year 1279 A.D (MCCLXXIX) was a common year starting on Sunday of the Julian calendar.

== Events ==
=== By place ===
==== Byzantine Empire ====
- July 17 – Battle of Devina: Emperor Michael VIII Palaiologos sends a Byzantine expeditionary force (some 10,000 men) to Bulgaria, to impose his ally (and son-in-law) Ivan Asen III on the throne. Tsar Ivaylo, former rebel leader (see Uprising of Ivaylo), attacks the Byzantines in the Kotel Pass, completely routing them. Many of them perish in the battle – while the rest are captured and later killed by orders from Ivaylo. Later, Michael sends another army of some 5,000 men, but this is also defeated by Ivaylo before reaching the Balkan Mountains. Without support, Ivan Asen has to flee to Constantinople and the turmoil in Bulgaria continues.

==== Europe ====
- March 5 – Battle of Aizkraukle: Lithuanian forces led by Grand Duke Traidenis defeat an army of Teutonic Knights of the Livonian Order at Aizkraukle. During the battle, the order suffers a great defeat, some 70 knights are killed, including Grand Master Ernst von Ratzeburg (or Rassburg). The Semigallians, allies of the Livonian Order, revolt but later submit to Traidenis for protection.
- July 20 – Siege of Algeciras: Castilian forces led by King Alfonso X ("the Wise") abandon the siege (begun in 1278), after their fleet (some 400 ships) is destroyed by the Marinids led by Sultan Abu Yaqub Yusuf an-Nasr. All prisoners are decapitated except the officers who are taken hostage. For the second time, the entire Castilian fleet is lost and Alfonso is forced to sign a new truce.
- August 5 – The Diet of Hungary adopts the so-called Cuman laws to regulate the social status and lifestyle of the nomadic and pagan Cumans living in the Kingdom of Hungary.
- November – Alfonso X ("the Wise") grants the cities of Medina-Sidonia and Alcalá de los Gazules to the Order of Saint Mary of Spain. He also donates the town of Morón de la Frontera to the Order of Alcántara.

==== England ====
- November 15 – The first of the Statutes of Mortmain are passed during the reign of King Edward I ("Longshanks"), which prevents land from passing into the possession of the Church.
- The second of two main surveys of the Hundred Rolls, a census seen as a follow-up to the Domesday Book completed in 1086, is begun; it lasts until 1280.
- The Royal Mint is moved into the Tower of London. Mints outside London are reduced, with only a few local and episcopal mints continuing to operate.

==== Levant ====
- Spring – Mamluk forces led by the 19-year-old Sultan Al-Said Barakah and Qalawun ("the Thousander") invade Cilician Armenia; a revolt in Egypt while they are away force Barakah to abdicate. In August, Qalawun takes over the government in Cairo and proclaims himself sultan. He sends Solamish, youngest son of former Sultan Baibars, into exile. Meanwhile, Sunqur al-Ashqar, Mamluk viceroy of Damascus, refuses to accept Qalawun's authority and begins a rebellion in Syria.

==== Africa ====
- Abu Ishaq, uncle of the Hafsid caliph Abu Ishaq Ibrahim I, sides with the Almohad rebels of Béjaïa, and takes Tunis.

==== Asia ====
- March 19 – Battle of Yamen: Kublai Khan's Mongol Yuan fleet attacks the Chinese Song fleet (some 1,000 ships) under Admiral Zhang Shijie at Yamen. The Mongols send fireships, but this is not effective as the Song fleet is coated with fire-resistant mud. Zhang Hongfan, commander of the Mongol forces, orders the Song fleet to be cut off from its base, depriving it of its supplies. He splits the Yuan fleet into four squadrons and again attacks the Song. The ill and weakened Song soldiers are no match for the Mongols in close combat, and the chaotic environment makes battle command impossible. The chained Song ships can neither support or maneuver. Song Chancellor Lu Xiufu and Emperor Zhao Bing drown themselves rather than be taken captive. This marks the end of the Song dynasty after three centuries, Kublai Khan becomes sole emperor of China. The Mongol Empire reaches its largest extent, although it has already partially fragmented.
- April 17 – Thawun Gyi settles at Taungoo (modern-day Myanmar), and becomes the first ruler of the Toungoo dynasty (until 1317).
- October 12 – The Dai-Gohonzon, supreme object of veneration of Nichiren Shōshū Buddhism, is said to be inscribed by Nichiren Daishonin.
- A Mongol Yuan embassy, sent by Kublai Khan to Japan, is killed by orders from Hōjō Tokimune, leading to a second invasion.
- Ram Khamhaeng becomes the third king of the Phra Ruang dynasty, ruling the Sukhothai Kingdom (modern-day Thailand).
- The Chola dynasty of South India falls under the rule of Rajendra Chola III, due to attacks by the Hoysala Empire and Pandya kingdom.

=== By topic ===
==== Cities and Towns ====
- The town of Haapsalu in Estonia is founded and later becomes the centre of the Bishopric of Ösel–Wiek.

==== Medicine ====
- Abu Bakr al-Razi's (or Rhazes') medical writings are translated into Latin by Faraj ben Salim, some 350 years after al-Razi's death.

== Births ==
- March 3 – Ismail I, Nasrid ruler of Granada (d. 1325)
- April 5 – Al-Nuwayri, Egyptian encyclopedist (d. 1333)
- Abu Asida Muhammad II, Hafsid ruler of Tunis (d. 1309)
- Antony Bek, English chancellor and bishop (d. 1343)
- Hōjō Hirotoki, Japanese nobleman and regent (d. 1315)
- John I, German nobleman (House of Hohenzollern) (d. 1300)
- Louis I, Duke of Bourbon ("the Lame"), French nobleman and knight (d. 1341)
- Muktabai (or Mukta), Indian religious leader (d. 1297)
- Nigel de Brus, Scottish nobleman and knight (d. 1306)
- Otto I, Polish nobleman (House of Griffin) (d. 1344)
- Zahida Abbasiyah, Abbasid poet and writer (d. 1328

== Deaths ==
- February 16 – Afonso III ("the Boulonnais"), king of Portugal (b. 1210)
- March 5 – Ernst von Ratzeburg, German knight and Grand Master
- March 16 – Joan of Dammartin, Spanish queen consort (b. 1220)
- March 19
  - Lu Xiufu (or Junshi), Chinese Grand Chancellor (b. 1236)
  - Zhao Bing, Chinese emperor (House of Zhao) (b. 1272)
- March 24 – Rinchen Gyaltsen, Tibetan imperial preceptor (b. 1238)
- April 2 – Abel Abelsøn, Danish nobleman and landowner (b. 1252)
- May 7 – Alberto da Bergamo, Italian Dominican friar (b. 1214)
- May 28 – William Wishart (or Wischard), Scottish bishop (b. 1225)
- July 15 – William Langton (or Rotherfield), English archdeacon
- July 22 – Philip of Spanheim, German archbishop and patriarch
- August 15 – Albert I, Duke of Brunswick-Lüneburg ("the Great"), German nobleman (b. 1236)
- September 3 – Étienne Tempier, French bishop and chancellor
- September 11 – Robert Kilwardby, English archbishop (b. 1215)
- September 18 – Ulrich II, Count of Württemberg, German nobleman and ruler (b. 1254)
- December 7 – Bolesław V the Chaste, Polish nobleman (b. 1226)
- December 18 – Richard of Gravesend, English priest and bishop
- Ajall Shams al-Din Omar, Persian governor and ruler (b. 1211)
- David de Lindsay, Scottish nobleman and Lord Chamberlain
- Gilla in Choimded Ó Cerbailláin (or Germanus), Irish bishop
- Li Ye (or Li Zhi), Chinese mathematician and writer (b. 1192)
- Robert de Ferrers, 6th Earl of Derby, English nobleman and landowner (b. 1239)
- Walter Giffard, English Lord Chancellor and archbishop (b. 1225)
