= Chen Wenlong =

Chinese general of the Song dynasty

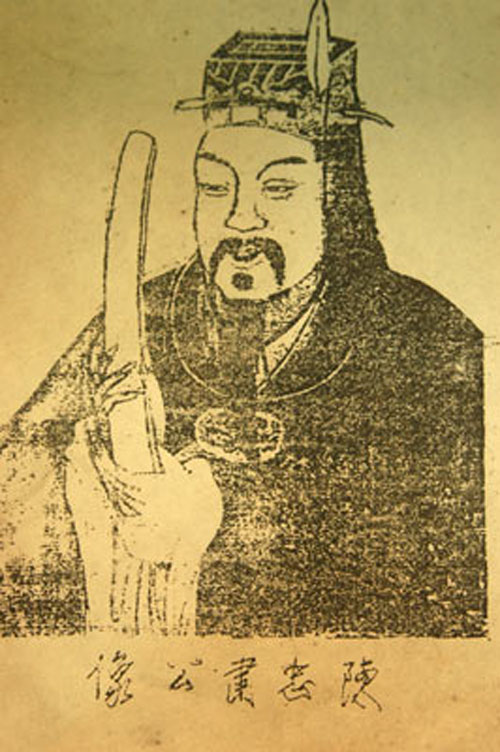
- Traditional Chinese: 陳文龍
- Simplified Chinese: 陈文龙
Transcriptions
Standard Mandarin
- Hanyu Pinyin: Chén Wénlóng
Eastern Min
- Fuzhou BUC: Dìng Ùng-lṳ̀ng
Pu-Xian Min
- Hinghwa BUC: Díng Meóng-le̤ng

Chen Wenlong (traditional Chinese: 陳文龍; simplified Chinese: 陈文龙, 9 March 1232 – 17 January 1277) was a scholar-general in the last years of the Southern Song dynasty and early Yuan dynasty. He became the City God of Fuzhou and Putian.

== Biography ==
Chen was born on 9 March 1232 (the 16th Day of Lunar 2 Month) in Yuhu Village, Putian, Fujian province (modern Licheng District, Putian). He passed local examination in 1251, and was selected into Taixue in 1256. In 1268, he participated in examinations in the capital, during which he was personally awarded first rank by the Emperor Duzong. Jia Sidao, who was the chancellor at that time, appreciated his talent for literary grace. Chen was later sent to Fuzhou, Jiangxi.

Soon after his loose power, the Yuan army invaded the Song empire and within a short period, the whole empire entered a chaotic situation. Emperor Gong had to surrender to the Yuan. Lu Xiufu and Zhang Shijie escaped to Fujian and installed Duanzong as the new emperor in 1275. Chen was summoned back to Fujian, and was ordered to stay guard at Fuzhou, the provisional capital at that time. The Yuan army marched into Fujian in the next year, Duanzong was forced to flee to Guangzhou, leaving Chen to resist in Fujian. Chen came to his homeland to recruit. He resisted in Xinghua (modern Putian) for two years. Later, he was captured and handed over to the Yuan. He refused to consider the thought of a surrender. He was taken to Dadu (modern Beijing). In the middle of the way, he starved and died in Hangzhou in the same year. His uncle Chen Zan (陳瓚) continued his career safeguarding Fuzhou.

Chen Wenlong and Chen Zan were posthumously appointed as the City God of Fuzhou and Putian, respectively, during the Ming dynasty. Chen Wenlong was posthumously given the title Shuibu Shangshu (水部尚書, "Secretary of Water Affairs"), and later Zhen Hai Wang (鎮海王, "Prince of Guard Oceans") by Chinese court. Chen was also regarded as one of oceanic deities in Fuzhou and Putian. He was called Shuang Zhong (雙忠, "two loyalists") together with his uncle Chen Zan by Putianese, while Fuzhounese call him Shangshu Gong (尚書公, "Duke Secretary").
