= Zhao Bing =

Emperor of Song China from 1278 to 1279

Zhao Bing 趙昺
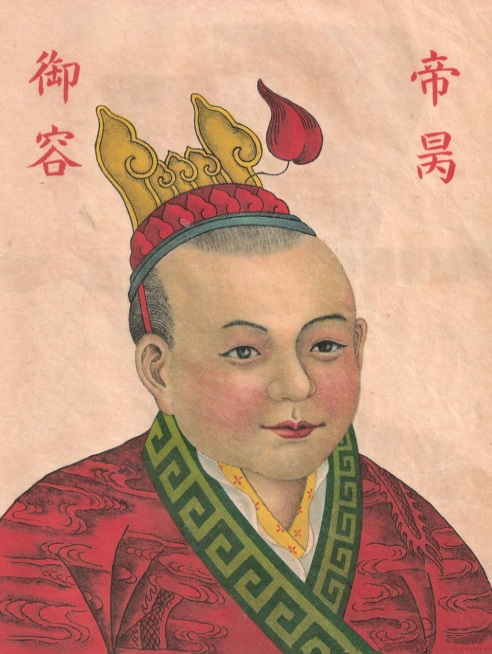
- 13th-century portrait of Zhao Bing

Emperor of the Song dynasty
- Reign: 10 May 1278 – 19 March 1279
- Coronation: 10 May 1278
- Predecessor: Emperor Duanzong
- Successor: Kublai Khan (Yuan dynasty)
- Born: Zhao Bing; 12 February 1272; Lin'an, Song Empire (present-day Hangzhou, Zhejiang, China)
- Died: 19 March 1279 (aged 7); Yamen, Guangnan East Circuit, Song Empire (present-day Xinhui, Guangdong, China)
- Burial: Song Shaodi's Tomb (宋少帝陵, in present-day Chiwan, Shenzhen, Guangdong)
Era dates
- Xiangxing (祥興; 1278–1279)
Temple name
- Huaizong (懷宗) (unofficially)
- House: Zhao
- Dynasty: Song (Southern Song)
- Father: Emperor Duzong
- Mother: Lady Yu

Zhao Bing
- Traditional Chinese: 趙昺
- Simplified Chinese: 赵昺
- Literal meaning: "Glorious Zhao"
Transcriptions
Standard Mandarin
- Hanyu Pinyin: Zhào Bǐng

Emperor Bing of Song
- Chinese: 宋帝昺
Transcriptions
Standard Mandarin
- Hanyu Pinyin: Sòng Dì Bǐng

Zhao Bing (12 February 1272 – 19 March 1279), also known as Emperor Bing of Song or Bing, Emperor of Song (宋帝昺), (Note: Note that the "Bing" refers to the emperor's personal given name. It is not a temple name (usually ending with -zu or -zong) unlike other Song emperors such as Emperor Duanzong, Emperor Duzong, Emperor Taizu, etc.) was the 18th and last emperor of the Song dynasty of China, who ruled as a minor between 6 and 7 years of age.

He was also the ninth and last emperor of the Southern Song dynasty. He reigned for around 313 days in 1278 and 1279. His reign, and the Song dynasty, ended with the Song's total defeat by the Mongol-led Yuan dynasty at the naval Battle of Yamen.

Zhao Bing and his entourage had been observing the naval combat from some coastal cliffs nearby. As the victorious enemy approached, the young emperor's advisor, Lu Xiufu, held the boy in his arms as the two of them leapt from the clifftops, killing them both.

== Early life ==
Zhao Bing was the seventh son of Zhao Qi (Emperor Duzong). His mother was Lady Yu (俞氏), a concubine of Emperor Duzong who held the rank of xiurong (修容). He was a younger half-brother of his predecessors, Zhao Xian (Emperor Gong) (r. 1275–1276) and Zhao Shi (Emperor Duanzong) (r. 1276–1278). He was enfeoffed as the "Prince of Xin" (信王) in 1274. His title was later changed to "Prince of Guang" (廣王).

On 4 February 1276, the Song capital, Lin'an (臨安; present-day Hangzhou), was conquered by forces of the Mongol-led Yuan regime commanded by the general Bayan. Emperor Gong surrendered to the Mongols, but his two brothers, Zhao Shi and Zhao Bing, managed to escape to Southern China with the help of officials such as Yang Liangjie (楊亮節), Lu Xiufu, Zhang Shijie, Chen Yizhong and Wen Tianxiang. They arrived in Jinhua, where Zhao Shi was appointed as Grand Marshal (天下兵馬都元帥) and Zhao Bing was appointed as Vice Grand Marshal (副元帥). Zhao Bing's title was also changed to "Prince of Wei" (衛王). On 14 June 1276, a seven-year-old Zhao Shi was enthroned in Fuzhou as the new emperor; he is historically known as Emperor Duanzong.

The Mongol general Bayan was bent on eliminating the threat posed by Song remnants, so he led his troops in pursuit and attacked southern China. After Emperor Duanzong died of illness in 1278, the Song forces' morale started to dwindle and soldiers began to desert the army. Lu Xiufu brought Zhao Bing to Meiwei (梅蔚), Gangzhou (碙州), which is in present-day Mui Wo, Lantau Island, Hong Kong. There, Zhao Bing was enthroned as the new emperor under the era name "Xiangxing" (祥興); Gangzhou was also renamed "Xianglong County" (祥龍縣). They moved to Yamen (in present-day Xinhui District, Jiangmen, Guangdong Province) to evade the Mongols.

== Reign ==
The Mongols sent the general Zhang Hongfan to lead troops to attack Zhao Bing and the Song remnants, leading to the Battle of Yamen. The Song forces, led by Zhang Shijie, put up fierce resistance against the Mongols in a naval battle but were eventually all wiped out by the enemy. On 19 March 1279, after realising all was lost, Lu Xiufu carried the seven-year-old Emperor Zhao Bing to a cliff, where they committed suicide by throwing themselves into the sea. Zhao Bing's death marked the end of the Song dynasty.

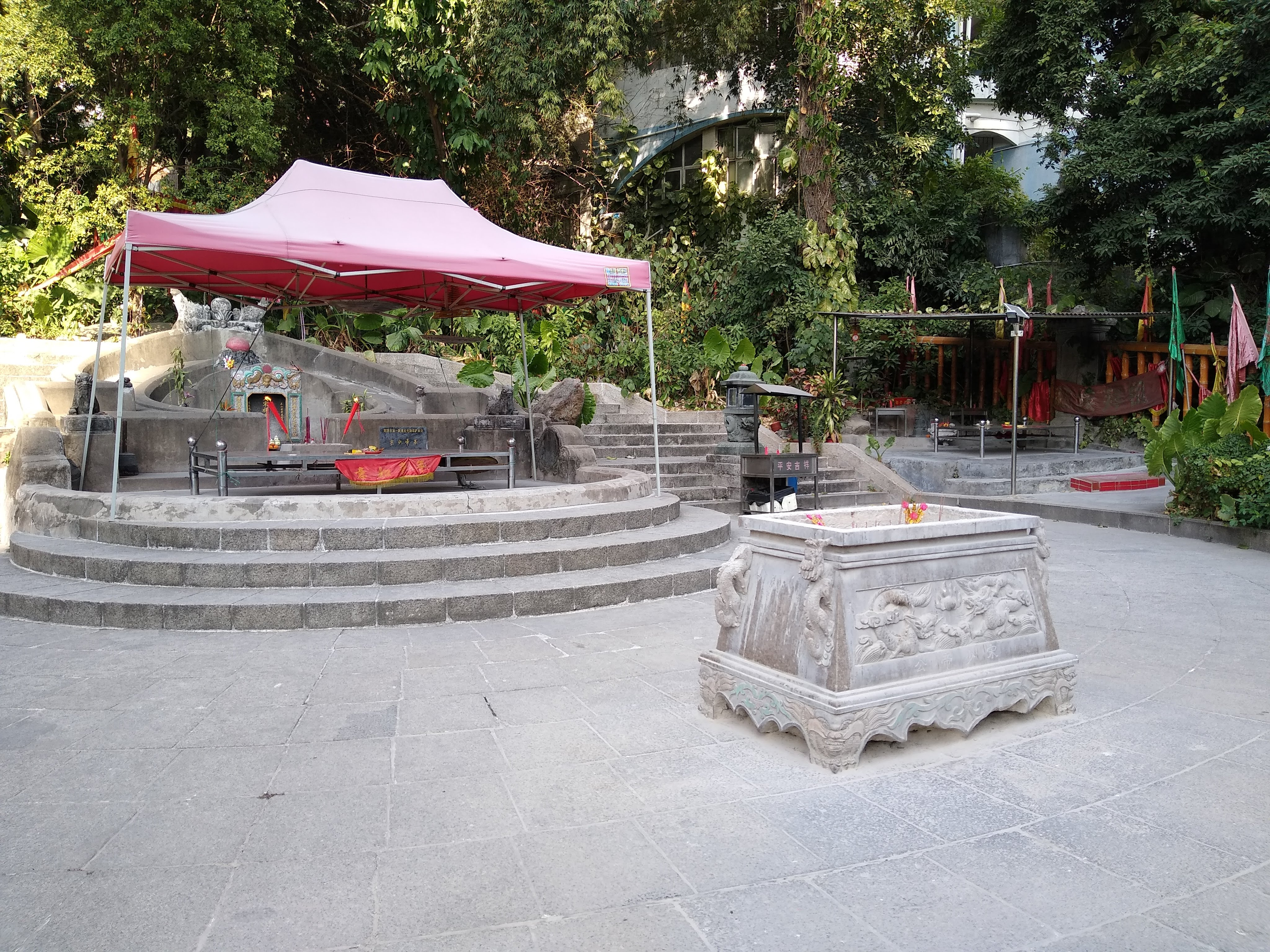
Tomb of Zhao Bing in Chiwan

Zhao Bing's tomb is located in present-day Chiwan, Nanshan District, Shenzhen. The grave was rediscovered in the 1960s, and despite the identity of the body interred within not being authenticated, in 1984 a joint Hong Kong-Shenzhen effort was made to restore and expand the modest gravesite.

=== Patriotic soup ===
According to the locals at the Guangdong Province, prior to the final battle with the Yuan forces at Yamen, Zhao Bing and the Song remnants sought shelter in a monastery at Chaozhou. The monastery's monks served an impromptu soup made of leaf vegetables, edible mushrooms, and vegetable broth. The emperor loved the soup and named it "Protect the Country Dish" (護國菜). A later generation named it in English "patriotic soup". After Zhao Bing died, the preparation of the soup became a way to honor the last Song emperor.

== See also ==
- Chinese emperors family tree (middle)
- List of emperors of the Song dynasty
- Sung Wong Toi

== Notes ==
Zhao Bing House of Zhao (960–1279) Born: 1271 Died: 1279
Regnal titles
| Preceded by Duanzong | Emperor of the Song dynasty 1278–1279 | Song dynasty ended |
