= Wen Tianxiang =

Song dynasty poet and politician (1236–1283)

Duke of Xin Wen Tianxiang
- 文天祥
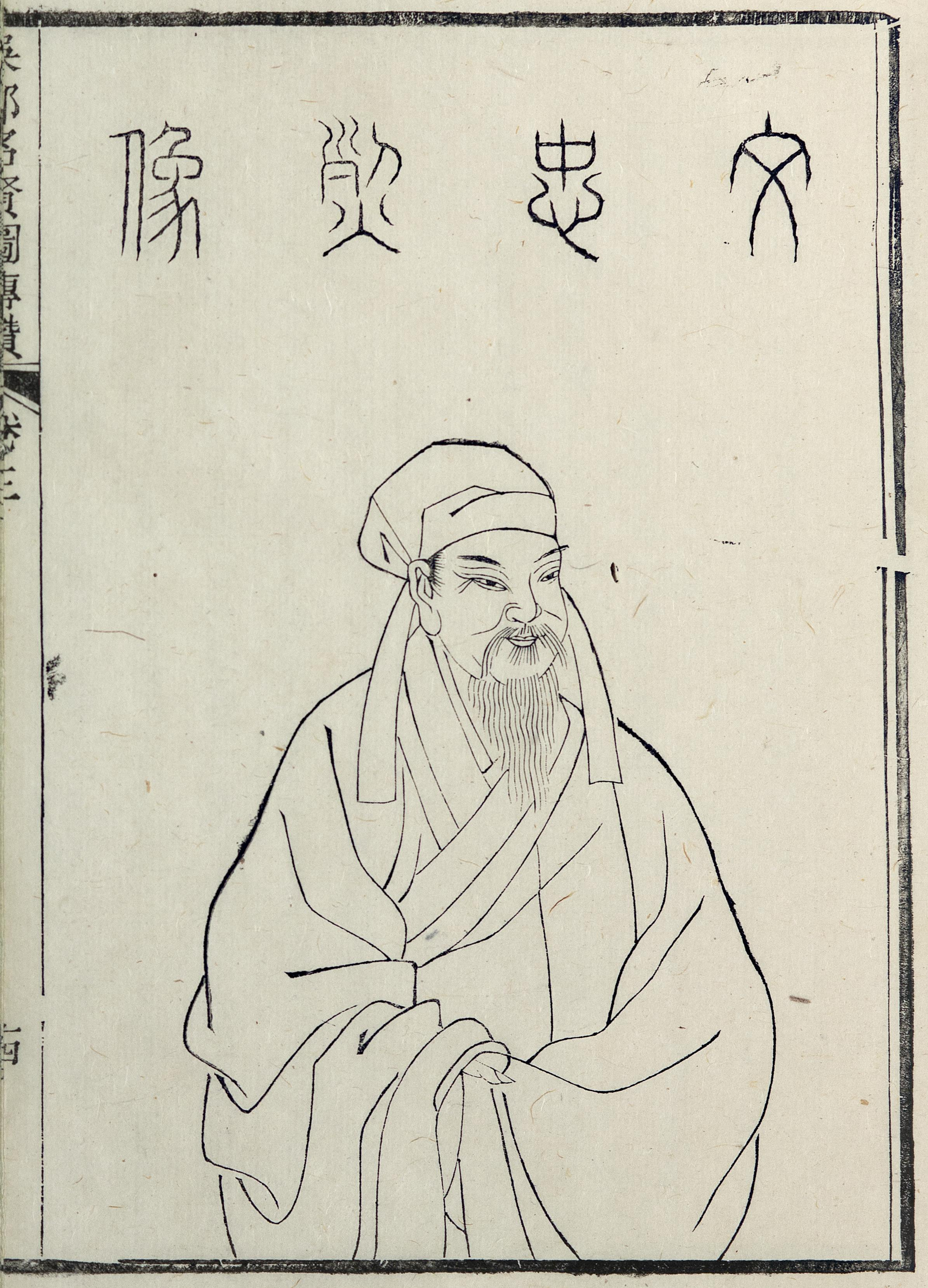

Grand Chancellor of the Right
- In office 18 June 1276 – 19 March 1279
- Monarchs: Emperor Duanzong; Emperor Bing
- Preceded by: Li Tingzhi
- In office 22 January 1276 – 2 May 1276
- Monarch: Emperor Gong
- Preceded by: Chen Yizhong
- Succeeded by: Li Tingzhi

Privy Court Magistrate
- In office 18 June 1276 – 19 March 1279
- Monarchs: Emperor Duanzong; Emperor Bing

Commissioner of the Privy Court
- In office 22 January 1276 – ?
- Monarch: Emperor Gong

Personal details
- Born: Wen Yunsun (文雲孫); 6 June 1236 Luling, Jiangnan West Circuit, Song (present-day Ji'an, Jiangxi)
- Died: 9 January 1283 (aged 46) Dadu, Great Yuan (present-day Beijing)
Wen Tianxiang
- Traditional Chinese: 文天祥
- Simplified Chinese: 文天祥
Transcriptions
Standard Mandarin
- Hanyu Pinyin: Wén Tiānxiáng

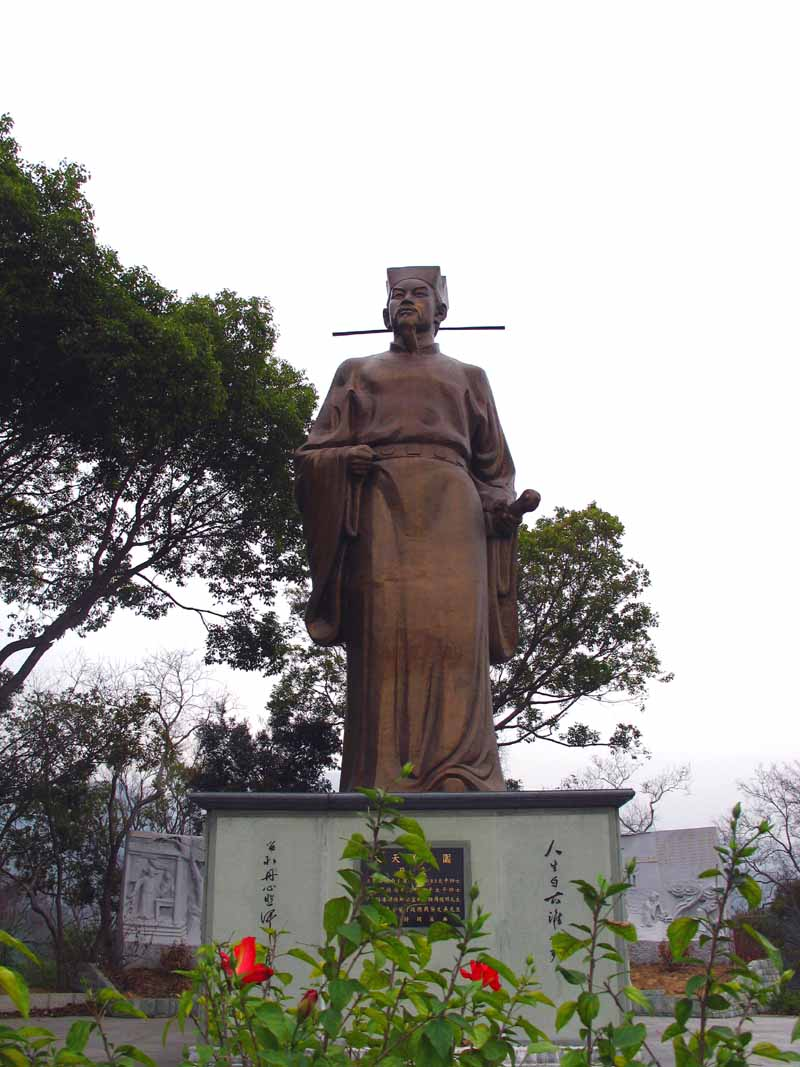
Statue of Wen Tianxiang (Man Tin Cheung) in San Tin, Hong Kong

Wen Tianxiang (Note: Originally named Yunsun (雲孫), courtesy name Tianxiang (天祥), art name Fouyou Daoren (浮休道人), he changed his given name and courtesy name to Tianxiang and Lüshan (履善) respectively after becoming a Gongshi. He became a Zhuangyuan and was granted the courtesy name Songrui (宋瑞) around 1256.) (Chinese: 文天祥; 6 June 1236 – 9 January 1283) was a Chinese statesman, poet and politician in the last years of the Southern Song dynasty. For his resistance to Kublai Khan's invasion of the Southern Song dynasty, and for his refusal to yield to the Yuan dynasty despite being captured and tortured, he is a popular culture hero symbol of patriotism, righteousness, and resistance against tyranny in China. He is known as one of the "Three Loyal Princes of the Song" (大宋三忠王), alongside Lu Xiufu and Zhang Shijie. Wen Tianxiang is depicted in the Table of Peerless Heroes (無雙譜) by Jin Guliang.

His continuing symbolic importance was evident in an event that took place in Wen Tianxiang's historical shrine in Haifeng in 1908, where Chen Jiongming persuaded over thirty young men from the village to swear secret support for a national revolution.

== Biography ==
Wen Tianxiang was born on 6 June 1236 in Luling (Ji'an), Jiangxi Province during the Song dynasty. At the age of 18, he excelled in his local examinations, and two years later participated in examinations in the capital, during which he was personally awarded first rank (Zhuangyuan) by Emperor Lizong. He would subsequently take up several posts in the government of the Southern Song, including being Attendant (郎官) of the Justice Ministry and Prefect of Ganzhou. Wen Tianxiang was frequently in conflict with the corrupt magistrate Jia Sidao and the pro-peace faction as he supported the war effort against the invading Mongols. Wen once requested the execution of a eunuch who proposed fleeing from the capital Lin'an. As a result, Wen was demoted and forced into premature retirement at the age of 37.

Later when the war situation further deteriotated, Wen was recalled an appointed as the Prefect of Ganzhou. He immediately recruited some troops from the local population and was later assigned to defend the region of Pingjiang (now in Suzhou, Jiangsu). In 1275, Yuan Mongols troops under Bayan attacked the Jiangsu and Jiejiang regions. Yuan forces quickly bypassed Pingjiang and marched directly to the region now known as Yuhang District. Wen Tianxiang hurriedly rushed to Yuhang but he was too late, his former base in Pingjiang was also quickly overwhelmed by the Mongols. Wen and his troops then retreated back to Lin'an. Together with Zhang Shijie, Wen Tianxiang proposed a plan to keep fighting, but it was rejected by Chancellor of the Right Chen Yizhong. At that time many Song court officials (including Chancellor of the Left Liu Mengyang) had already run away fearing the approaching Yuan troops, while others were mostly pro-peace. Pro-war figures like Zhang Shijie also left to continue the fight on their own. The Song Empress Dowager finally decided to surrender, and Wen was appointed as the new Chancellor of the Right to lead the Song delegation to ask the Yuan for peace (1276).

However, Wen Tianxiang didn't plead for a surrender as tasked. When meeting Bayan, Wen asked Bayan about the Mongol's intentions and demanded the retreat of the Yuan forces:

"If the Northern Dynasty [Yuan] considers Song as a country, then please call your troops back to Pingjiang or Jiaxing, then we will negiotate about paying tribute. It will be the best solution as North forces will go back to their country unscathed. But if you intend to destroy our Zongmiao, then it will not be easy for you to take over our province of Huai, Jie, Min or Guang, your forces may even end up in disaster. Your victory is not certain."

Seeing that Wen Tianxiang was determined to not surrender, Bayan arrested Wen in the Mongol headquarters. An enraged but helpless Wen Tianxiang could only witness the Empress Dowager and other Song court officials finalize their surrender. Nonetheless, Wen managed to escape from the Yuan Mongol camp, and head to Yang province. The Yang prefect wrongly suspected Wen as a spy from the Yuan, therefore Wen further travelled south and finally met Zhang Shije and Chen Yizhong in Fuzhou, this time with a newly crowned Emperor Duanzong. After a brief discussion, Wen travelled to Nanjian pronvince (now located as Nanping, Fujian province) to recruit troops, then marched to Jiangxi. Wen managed to gain several victories, but he was soon overwhelmed by the Yuan forces led by Zhang Hongfan and was captured (7 February 1278).

Wen was treated well by Zhang Hongfan and was promised a prestigious Yuan post in exchange for his surrender, but Wen refused. Later, after Song resistance forces were devastated at the Battle of Yamen (1279), Zhang again extended the same offer, reasoning that Wen was no longer bound by his loyalty to the now extinguished Song Dynasty. Wen again categorically refused, saying that "I was a court officer of the Song but failed to save the country. I deserve to be tried as a criminal, why should I cling to my life now?" Zhang had no choice but escort Wen to Dadu. He was imprisoned in a military prison. During this time he wrote the poems "Song of Righteousness" (正氣歌), and "Crossing the Lingding Sea", the latter of which included these lines of defiance in the face of Mongol rule:

人生自古誰無死
留取丹心照汗青。
Humans, since antiquity, have all found death;
Leave our red hearts to shine in green history.

The Yuan court, still hoping to persuade Wen Tianxiang, sent the former Song Chancellor Liu Mengyan (the one who had run away when the Mongols approached Lin'an) to see Wen in prison. An enraged Wen Tianxiang immediately gave Liu a violent scolding. The Yuan sent former Emperor Gong of Song to persuade Wen, but he simply answered: "Your Highness please come back to the palace!" Later his brother Wen Pi was also sent to the prison with the same task, and Wen Tianxang said: "We have the same parents but do not serve under the same sky!" During the imprisonment, Wen Tianxiang also received letters from his daughter, informing him that his whole family was held captive in the Yuan royal palace. Wen then replied: "I have received the letter. My soul aches. Everyone has relatives and family, but in this circumstance I can only choose death; there is no alternative."

In 1283, Wen Tianxiang was summoned to appear before Kublai Khan. He briefly bowed his head to greet the Yuan Emperor, but refused to prostrate as a subordinate of the Yuan. Kublai Khan expressed respect to Wen and again offered him a prestigious position. Wen repeated his refusal, saying: "I am Song's chancellor, I cannot serve another dynasty! I can only accept death, if not, I cannot face the martyrs at the Underworld. [...] I only desire death, I have nothing to say." At that time an uprising arose and the rebels declared they would attack Dadu "to rescue Chancellor Wen". Kublai Khan had no choice but to execute Wen Tianxiang.

It is said that after Wen's death, people discovered his death poem written as:

孔曰成仁， 孟曰取義。 惟其義盡， 所以仁至。 讀聖賢書， 所學何事？ 而今而後， 庶幾無愧。	Confucius speaks of perfecting nobility, Mencius speaks of choosing duty. It is only by fulfilling duty to the upmost, That one obtains nobility. What does one learn, Studying the classics of the Sages From this point on, I can perhaps be free from shame.

== Ancestry and descendants ==
Wen Tianxiang adopted the three sons of his younger brother when his two sons died young.

Wén Qīmèi (文七妹, born Xiangxiang 1867, died 1919), mother of Mao Zeodong, former chairman of the Chinese Communist Party and the China, is a 22nd generation descendant of Wen Tianxiang

There are now at least six branches of the Wen family in the provinces of Jiangxi, Hunan, Hainan, Guangdong, Fujian, and in Hong Kong and overseas locations. Local dialect pronunciations would be "Man" (Cantonese), "Vun" (Hakka), "Boon" (Hokkien) and "Bhung" (Teochew). The "Man" clan are considered one of the original founding families in the history of Hong Kong.

The well-known Ming dynasty painter and calligrapher Wen Zhengming also belonged to the Wen family. The mother of Mao Zedong, Wen Qimei, was a descendant as well.

One of the oldest continuous branches of the Wen family established itself in the Hengyang/Hengshan area of present-day Hunan shortly after 1000. A branch of this Wen family settled in the United States in the mid-1940s and is related through marriage to the prominent Sun family of Shouxian, Anhui (Sun Jianai; Fou Foong Flour Company 福豐麵粉廠) and the Li family of Hefei, Anhui (Li Hongzhang).

== Monuments ==
=== Jiangxi ===
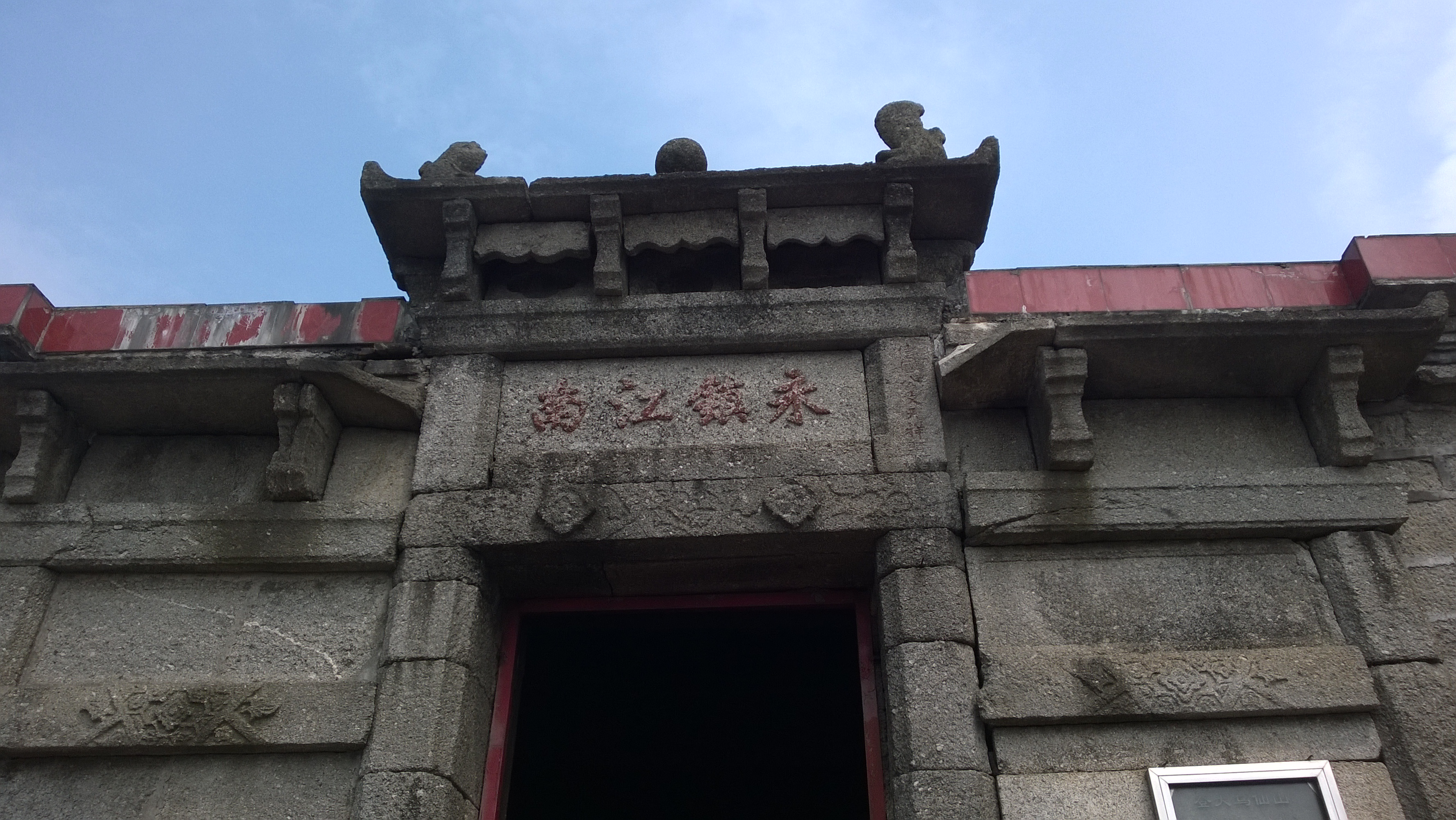
Dawushan Temple in Xingguo, Jiangxi, which is dedicated to Wen Tianxiang. Here the inscription on Paifang is written by Wen, saying “Pacifying Jiangnan Forever”

Wen Tianxiang's hometown in Ji'an, Jiangxi honors the famous national hero with a mausoleum. Exhibitions of paintings, calligraphy, and even army uniforms supposedly left by Wen are displayed in the Wen Family Ancestral Temple in Futian. The Wen Tianxiang Mausoleum is located in Wohushan.

=== Beijing ===
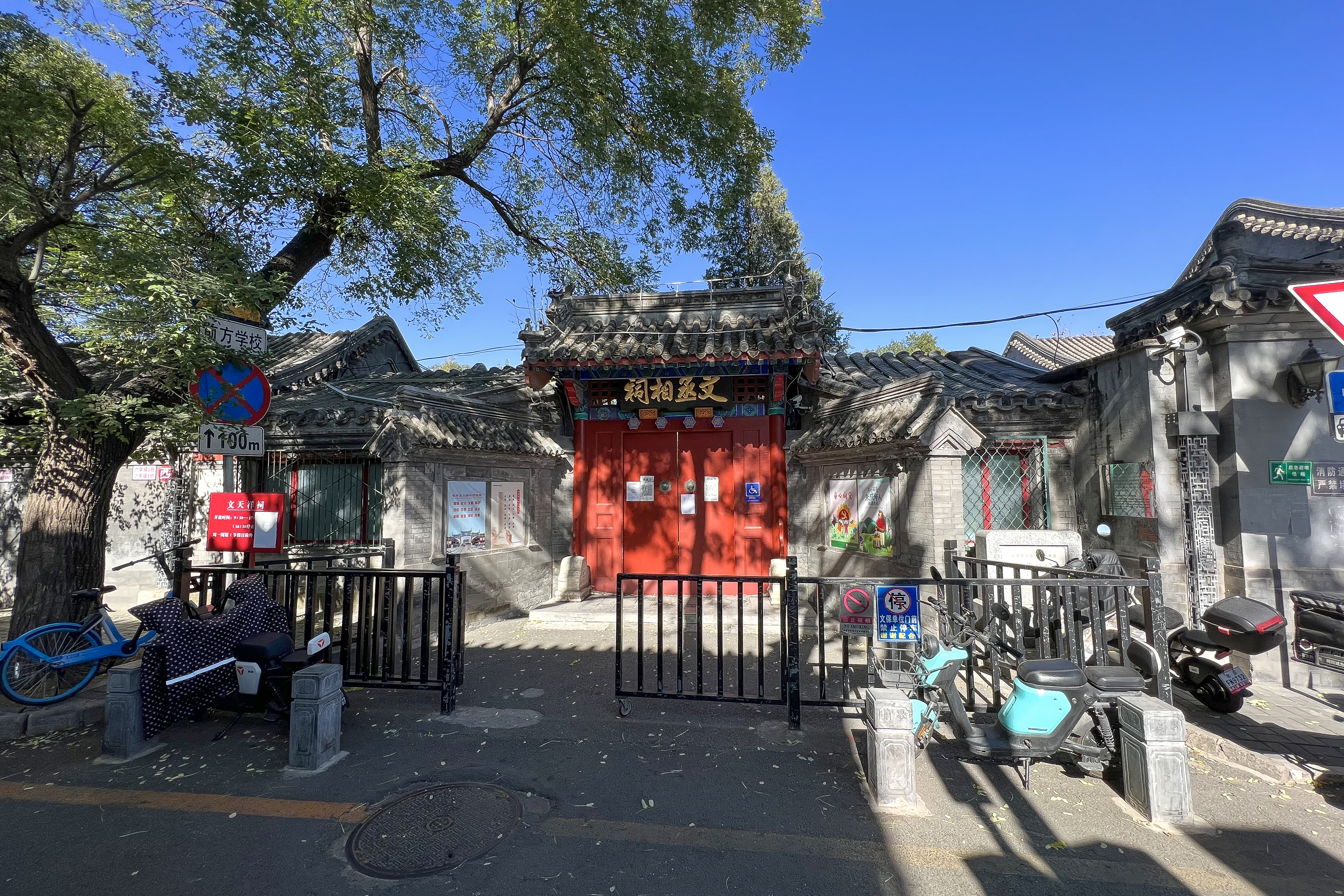
Ancestral Temple for Prime Minister Wen Tianxiang in Dongcheng, Beijing

The Memorial to Prime Minister Wen Tianxiang was built in 1376 during the reign of the Hongwu Emperor of the Ming dynasty. The location of Wen's execution is thought to be near the entrance to Fuxue Alley in the East City District of Beijing and a memorial has been established on the northern side of the entrance to South Fuxue Alley near Beixinqiao.

"The Song Dynasty's Top Ranking Scholar and Prime Minister, the West River's Filial Son and Loyal Subject," is carved into the columns of the memorial's main hall.

=== Guangdong ===
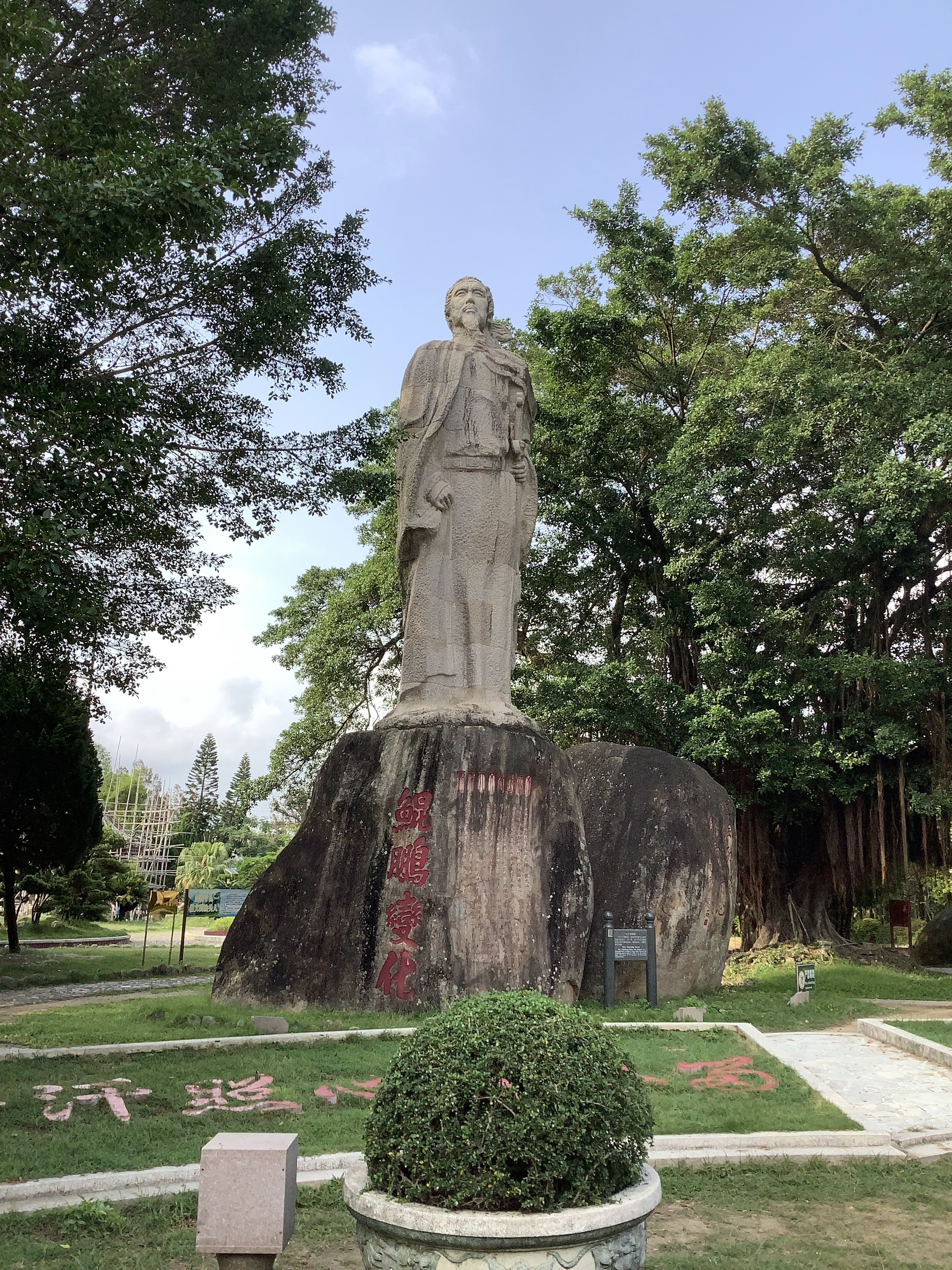
Statue of Wen in Shantou, Guangdong

The "Golden Marshal's Cemetery" commemorating the heroes of the anti-Yuan nationality at the end of the Song dynasty was established in the Gurao Township, Chaoyang District, Shantou City, Guangdong Province. There are many legends about Wen Tianxiang in the area of Gurao Town, Chaoyang District. According to legend, in the last years of the Southern Song dynasty, Wen Tianxiang raised an army in Chaoyang to resist the invading Yuan forces and was captured in Haifeng County during the campaign. Due to the great disparity in strength between the two sides, most of the Song soldiers were killed. Based on investigation, there are nine Song tombs in Gu Rao and neighboring towns. In later years, festive activities were held to commemorate Marshal General Wen Tianxiang and his descendant, These develop into what is known as the Gurao Festival. During this festival, the villages are covered with red and green, and the villagers walk through the streets to perform folk art tours. Overseas travellers have also returned to their hometowns.

=== Taiwan ===
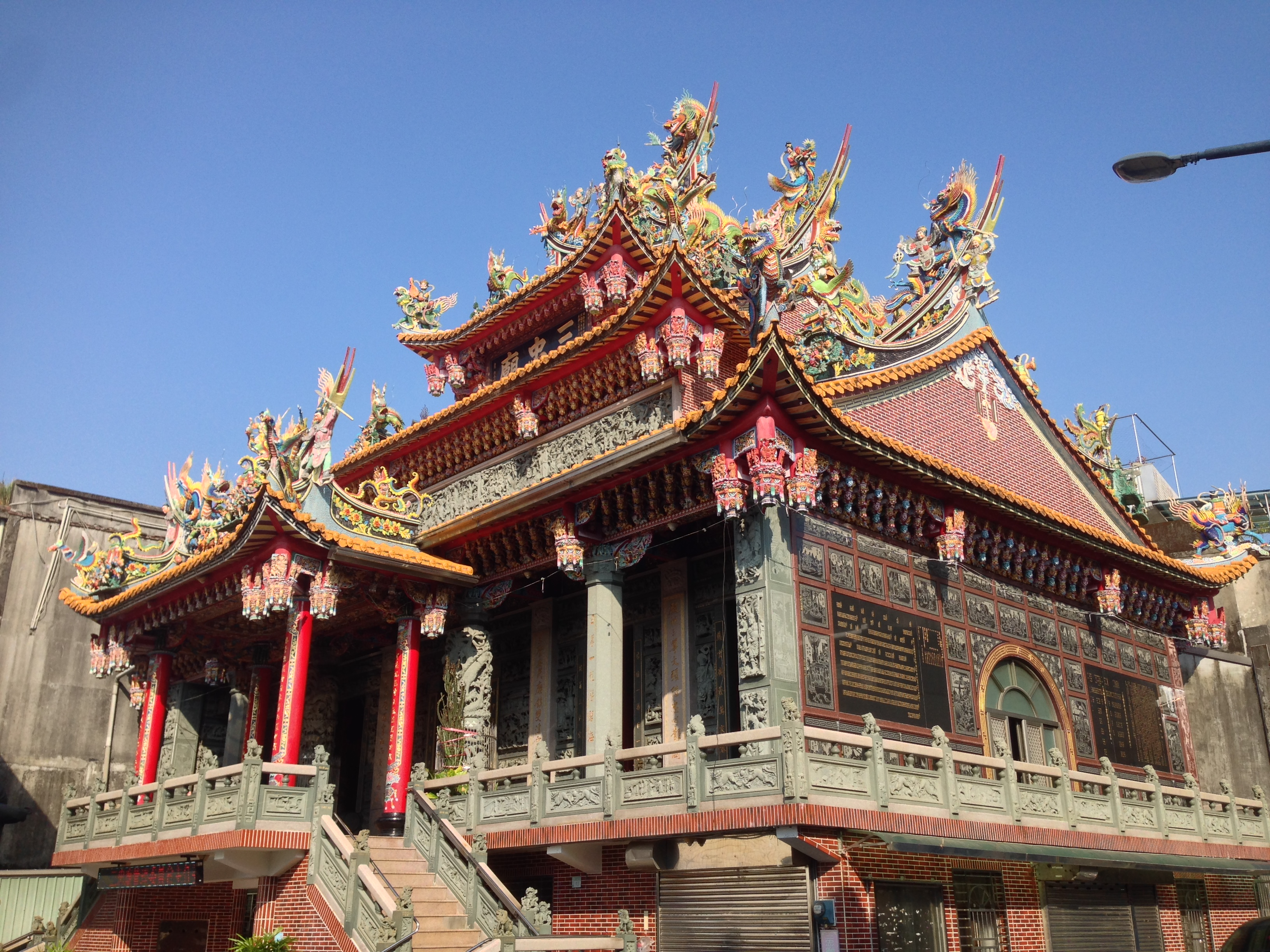
The Three Loyalist Temple (三忠廟) in Shuangxi, Taipei, commemorating Wen Tianxiang, Lu Xiufu, and Zhang Shijie

In the late 1950s and 1960s, a place called Tapido, within the present Taroko National Park, was renamed "Tianxiang" in memory of Wen Tianxiang during the construction of the Central Cross-Island Highway. Tianxiang is now a famous resort in the east of Taiwan.

In addition, three streets also take their name from Wen (i.e. the "Tianxiang Road"). One is in Zhongshan District, Taipei nearby the Minquan W. Road MRT station, another is in Sanmin District, Kaohsiung and the other is in Xiulin, Hualien County.

=== Hong Kong ===
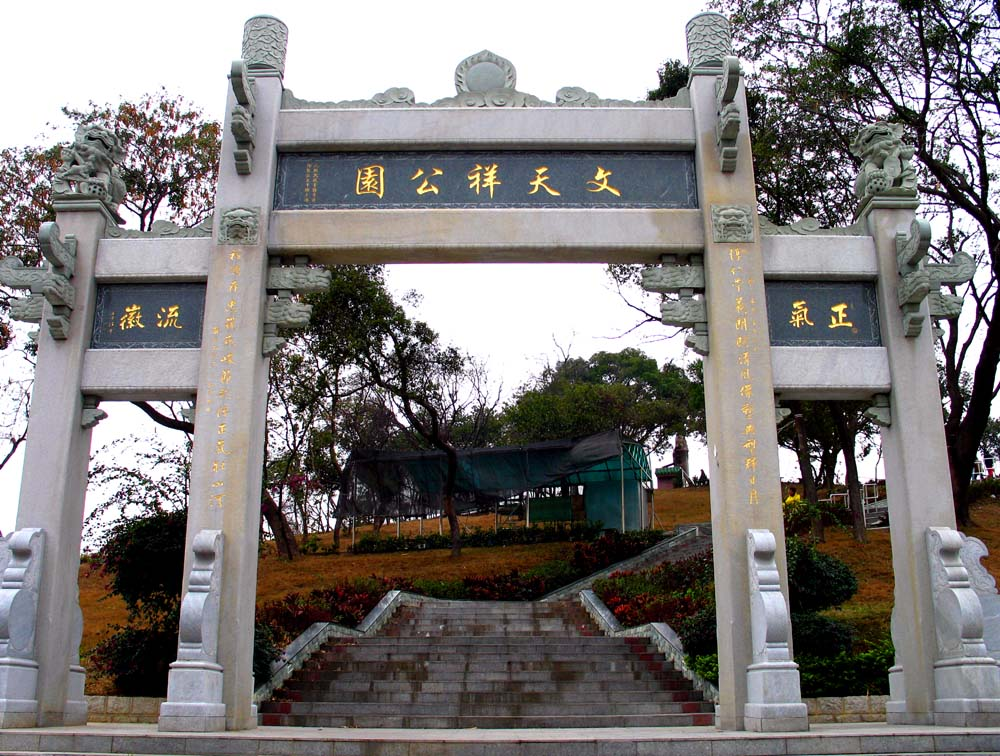
Man Tin Cheung Memorial Park in San Tin, Hong Kong

The San Tin area in the New Territories of Hong Kong is home to many villagers surnamed "Man", the Cantonese pronunciation of "Wen". The "Man" villagers trace their ancestry to Wen Tianxiang via Man Tin-Sui, also a famous Song dynasty general and the cousin of Wen Tianxiang.

A Man Tin Cheung Memorial Park and "Man" ancestral hall and residence (Tai Fu Tai Mansion) in San Tin are historical attractions in Hong Kong.

== See also ==
- History of the Song dynasty
- List of Chinese people
- Grand chancellor (China)
- Yue Fei
- Lu Xiufu
- Zhang Shijie
- Wang Anshi
- Sima Guang
- Fan Zhongyan
