= List of emperors of the Song dynasty =

Emperor of the Song dynasty
- 宋朝皇帝
- Imperial
- A hanging-scroll portrait painting of Emperor Taizu of Song (r. 960–976), painted by an anonymous Song artist

Details
- Style: His Imperial Majesty (陛下); Guanjia (官家)
- First monarch: Emperor Taizu (Northern Song); Emperor Gaozong (Southern Song)
- Last monarch: Emperor Qinzong (Northern Song); Emperor Huaizong (Southern Song)
- Formed: 960 (Northern Song); 1127 (Southern Song)
- Abolished: 1127 (Northern Song); 1279 (Southern Song)
- Residences: Imperial City, Bianliang; Imperial City, Lin'an
- Appointer: Hereditary

The Song dynasty (960–1279) was an imperial dynasty of China that succeeded the period referred to as Five Dynasties and Ten Kingdoms period (907–960) and preceded the Yuan dynasty (1271–1368), which conquered the Song dynasty in 1279. The conventional division into the Northern Song dynasty (960–1127) and Southern Song dynasty (1128–1279) is created by the conquest of northern China by the Jin dynasty (1115–1234) in 1127 and the consequent shift of the capital from Bianjing (present-day Kaifeng) in the north to Lin'an (present-day Hangzhou) in the south.

Below is a complete list of Song emperors, including their temple names, posthumous names, given names, and era names. The dynasty was founded by Zhao Kuangyin, who became Emperor Taizu (r. 960–976) and concluded with the death of Zhao Bing (r. 1278–1279). The last emperor of the Northern Song was Emperor Qinzong (r. 1126–1127), while the first Southern Song emperor was Emperor Gaozong (r. 1127–1162).

The emperor (huangdi) was the supreme head of state during the imperial era of China (221 BC – AD 1912), including the Song dynasty. He was a hereditary ruler who shared executive powers with civilian scholar-officials appointed to various levels of office according to their performance in bureaucratic examinations. The growing importance of the civilian bureaucracy and national gentry class during the Song dynasty led to a much more limited role for the emperor in shaping public policy, although he still maintained his autocratic authority. He had the sole right to establish new laws, although he was expected to respect legal precedents set forth by previous emperors of his dynasty.

== Background ==
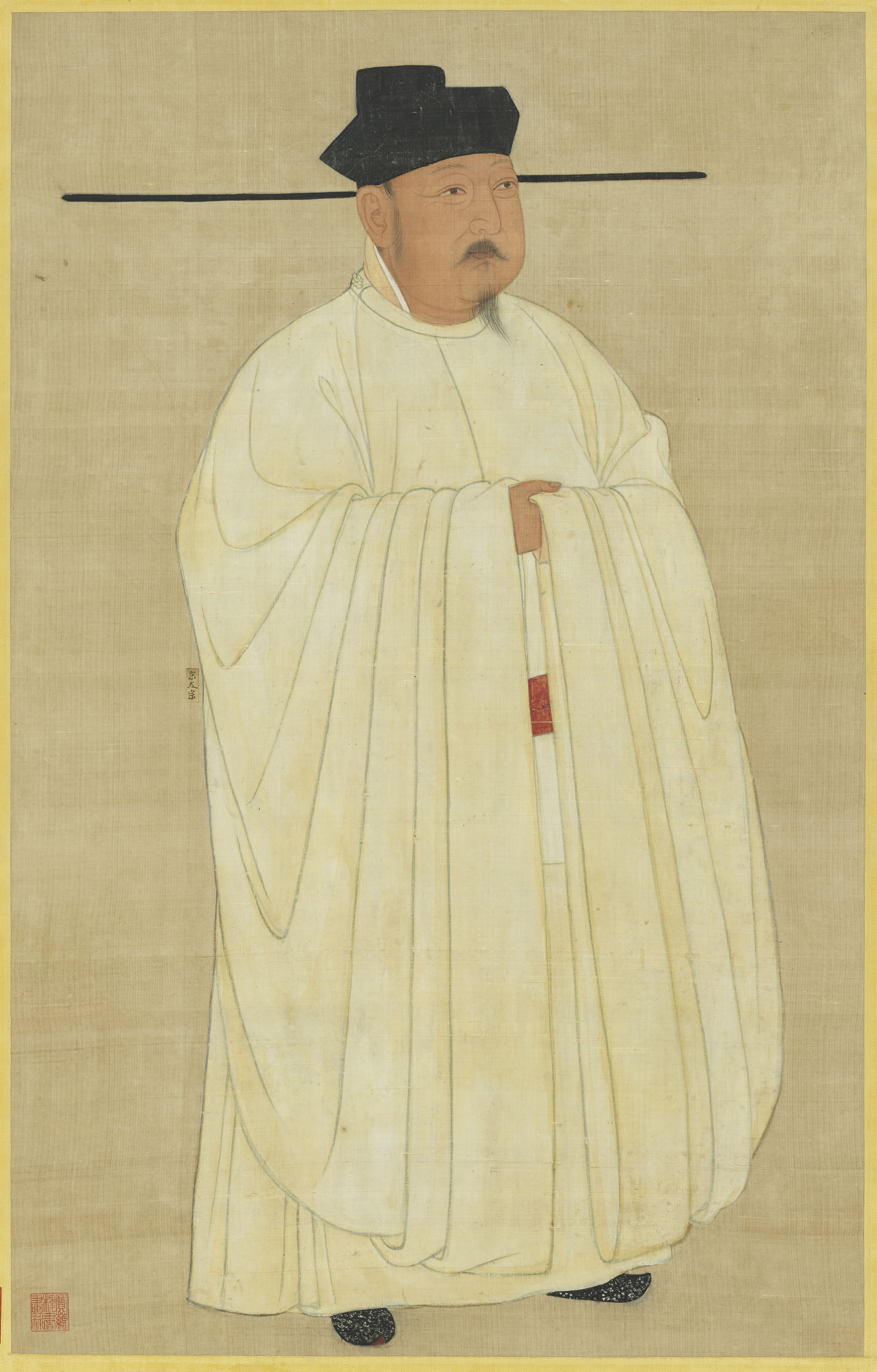
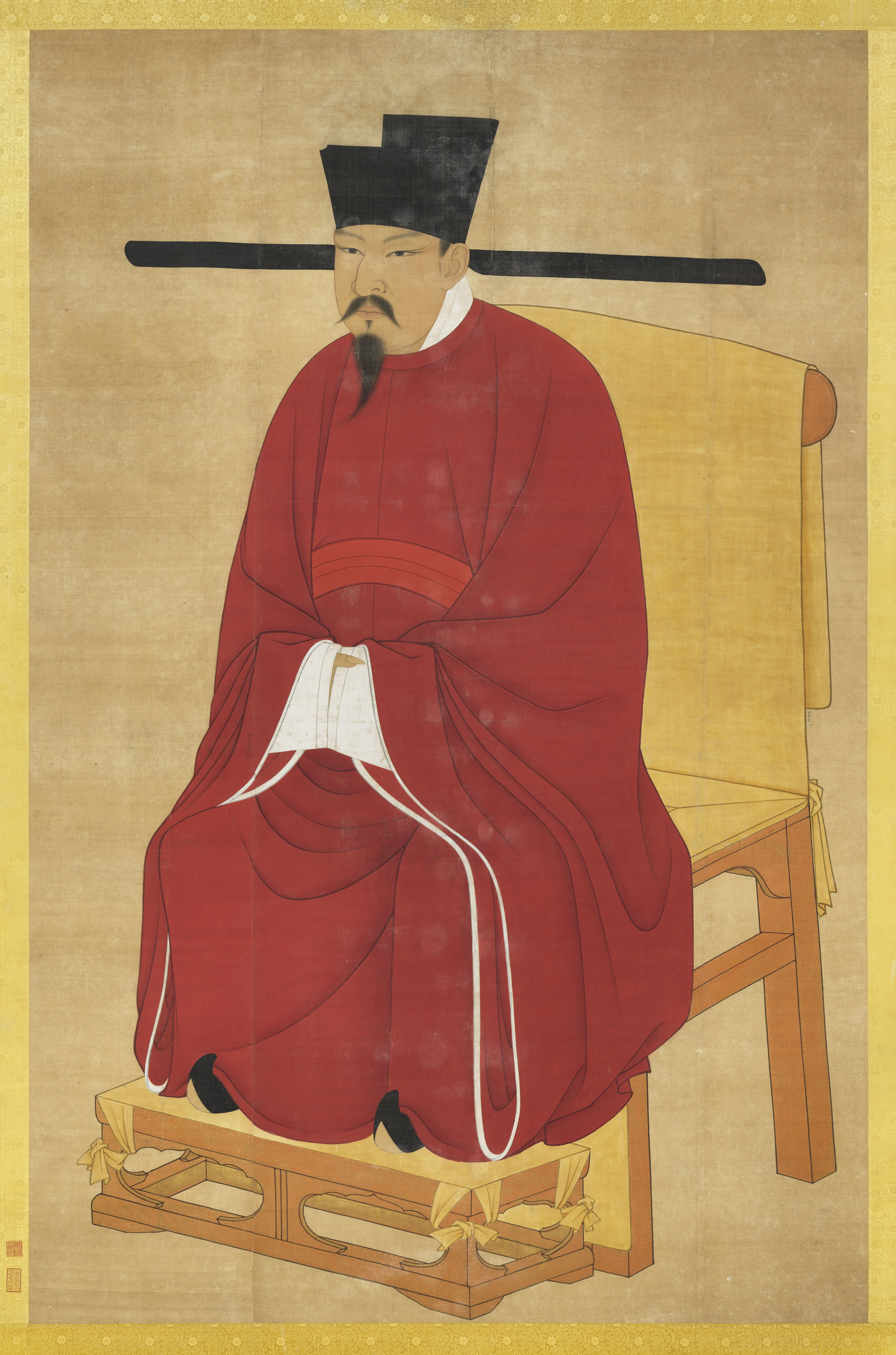
Left image: Portrait of Emperor Taizong (r. 976–997) by an anonymous Song artist
Right image: Portrait of Emperor Shenzong (r. 1067–1085) by an anonymous Song artist

The Song dynasty was founded by Zhao Kuangyin (Emperor Taizu) (r. 960–976) in 960, before the Song completely reunified China proper by conquest—excluding only the Sixteen Prefectures. The Song fought a series of wars with the Liao dynasty (1125–1279), ruled by the Khitans, over the possession of the Sixteen Prefectures of northern China. The Liao regime was toppled in 1125 in a joint conquest by Song forces and the Jurchens led by Wuqimai (Emperor Taizong) (r. 1123–1134). However, the Jin quickly turned against the Song and invaded Song's northern territory. In what is known as the Jingkang Incident, Jin forces captured the Song capital, Bianjing (present-day Kaifeng), in 1127, along with Emperor Huizong (r. 1100–1126), then a retired emperor, and his ruling son Emperor Qinzong (r. 1126–1127).

Emperor Gaozong (r. 1127–1162), a son of Emperor Huizong, fled south and reestablished the Song dynasty at what is now Nanjing. He established a temporary capital at Lin'an (present-day Hangzhou) in 1129, yet by 1132 he declared it the official capital of the Song Empire. The Jin made several failed attempts to conquer the Southern Song, but in 1165 Emperor Xiaozong of Song (r. 1162–1189) and Emperor Shizong of Jin (r. 1161–1189) agreed to a peace treaty that resulted in a diplomatic accord being reached between the two empires. The Song continued to rule southern China until 1279, when the Yuan dynasty led by Kublai Khan, the Khagan of the Mongols, invaded and conquered Song. The last ruler was Zhao Bing (r. 1278–1279), who was killed on 19 March 1279 during the naval Battle of Yamen in what is now modern Yamen Town in Xinhui District, Jiangmen City, Guangdong Province.

== Titles and names ==
From the Qin dynasty (221–206 BC) until the Qing dynasty (1644–1912), the ruling head of state was known as huangdi, or emperor. In Chinese historical texts, emperors of the Song dynasty, along with the Tang and Yuan dynasties, are referred to by their temple names. Before the Tang dynasty (618–907), emperors were generally referred to in historical texts by their posthumous names. During the Ming (1368–1644) and Qing dynasties, emperors were exclusively referred to in historical texts by their single era name, whereas emperors of previous dynasties, including the Song, usually had multiple era names. The amount of written characters used in posthumous names grew steadily larger from the Han dynasty (202 BC – AD 220) onwards and thus became overly long when referring to sovereigns. For example, the posthumous name of Nurhaci (r. 1616–1626), the founder of the Manchu state which would eventually establish the Qing dynasty, contained 29 written characters. By the Tang dynasty, much shorter temple names were preferred when referring to the emperor, a preference that was carried into the Song dynasty. Each emperor also had a tomb name (陵號; línghào) and various other honorific titles.

== Head of state ==
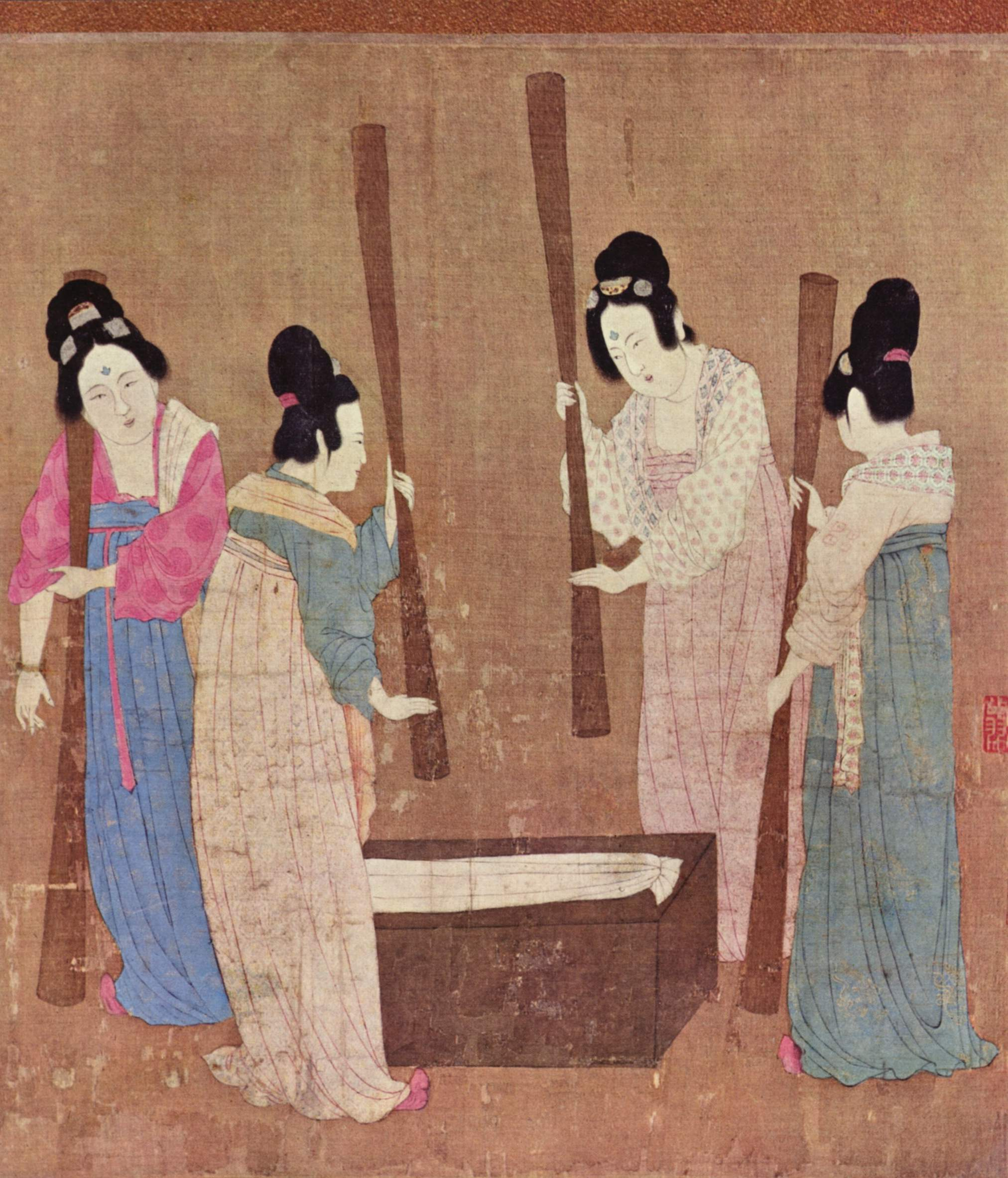
Peter K. Bol writes that Emperor Huizong's political ideology and artwork, such as this piece showing women preparing silk, has much in common with official Li Jie's (李誡; 1065–1110) 1103 architectural treatise Yingzao Fashi: "high technical standards, a lack of interest in individual variation, a concern with effective functioning, and a coherence of design in which all the parts fit together seamlessly"

In theory, the emperor's political power was absolute, but even during the Han dynasty, he shared executive powers with civilian officials and normally based his decisions on the advice and formal consensus of his ministers. During the Song dynasty, a national examination system (Civil Service Exam) managed by scholar-bureaucrats was used to recruit officials; those who passed the palace examination – the highest-level examination in the empire – were appointed directly by the emperor to the highest central government positions. Like commoners, these senior officials had to obey his edicts as law or be punished. However, senior officials not only challenged the emperor over policy, but restrained him by invoking the ideal Confucian mores and values of the literati gentry class from which they came.

During the preceding Tang dynasty, the civil service examinations did not yet produce the high number of officials as they would during the Song dynasty; a hereditary aristocracy remained dependent on the court for attaining rank and holding office. Song rulers, particularly Emperor Huizong, encountered a great deal of political opposition despite attempts to attain the ideals of the sage kings of antiquity. The inability of the sovereign to monopolise political authority was linked to the rise of a new class of gentry and scholar-official who filled the bureaucracy.

When the Song dynasty was founded, the political elites consisted of officials (and their sons) who had served in the Five Dynasties era, as well as those who came from prominent families which boasted an aristocratic ancestry and had provided officials for generations. Since the first Song emperors wished to avoid domination of government by military strongmen such as the jiedushi of the previous era, they limited the power of military officers and focused on building a powerful civilian establishment. During the 11th century, the expansion of schools and local academies nurtured a nationwide gentry class which provided most if not all officials. By the late 11th century, the elite marriage strategies of prominent families eroded due to the intense partisan politics surrounding the New Policies of Chancellor Wang Anshi (1021–1086). These great families were replaced by officials representing diverse local gentry lineages throughout the country.

Peter K. Bol states that the supporters of Wang Anshi's expansionist, activist central government in his New Policies were convinced that he understood the dao which brought utopia to Western Zhou (c. 1050 – c. 771 BC) antiquity and were determined to conform society according to his vision. The marginalised emperor – the last remaining aristocrat with any true political power – embraced the fiction that he was like the sage kings of old who brought society into a state of total harmony with court rituals and policy reforms. Yet after the reign of Emperor Huizong, Song rulers and officials alike disregarded the New Policies and focused instead on reforming society through a local, bottom-up approach. For example, Emperor Huizong attempted from 1107 to 1120 to bar anyone who had not attended a government school from serving in public office. He thus rejected anyone who did not acknowledge his brand of Confucian ideology as orthodoxy. However, the government-run school system during the Southern Song eventually lost prominence to private academies, which had outnumbered government schools during the early Northern Song. Even before Emperor Huizong's reign, Sima Guang (1019–1086), a prominent chancellor and political rival to Wang Anshi, had little to say about the emperor's role in shaping major reforms and public policy, mentioning only that the emperor made major appointments when necessary.

Emperors could choose whether to supervise the policy bureaucracy or to pursue scholarship, cults, hobbies, or women instead. However, Frederick W. Mote argues that most Song emperors – who spent much of their childhood confined and isolated within a luxurious palace – were aloof conformists detached from the world of normal affairs and thus relied on officialdom to administer the government. While the mainstream view is that the Song court exercised the highest degree of restraint and courtesy towards civil officials, the new protocol of enhanced deferential treatment by officials towards the emperor during conferences and meetings further eroded the emperor's close contact with his ministers.

== List ==
Northern Song (960–1127)
Portrait	Temple name (Note: Convention: "Song" + temple name or posthumous name except last emperor who was revered as "Song Di Bing" (宋帝昺))	Posthumous name	Birth name	Lifespan	Reign	Era names
	Taizu (太祖)	啟運立極英武睿文神德聖功至明大孝皇帝	Zhao Kuangyin (趙匡胤)	927‍–‍976	960‍–‍976	Jianlong (建隆; 960‍–‍963); Qiande (乾德; 963‍–‍968); Kaibao (開寶; 968‍–‍976)
	Taizong (太宗)	至仁應道神功聖德文武睿烈大明廣孝皇帝	Zhao Jiong (趙炅)	939‍–‍997	976‍–‍997	Taipingxingguo (太平興國; 976‍–‍984); Yongxi (雍熙; 984‍–‍988); Duangong (端拱; 988‍–‍989); Chunhua (淳化; 990‍–‍994); Zhidao (至道; 995‍–‍997)
	Zhenzong (真宗) (Note: Empress Consort Liu was regent at the end of Zhenzong's rule)	應符稽古神功讓德文明武定章聖元孝皇帝	Zhao Heng (趙恆)	968‍–‍1022	997‍–‍1022	Xianping (咸平; 998‍–‍1003); Jingde (景德; 1004‍–‍1007); Dazhongxiangfu (大中祥符; 1008‍–‍1016); Tianxi (天禧; 1017‍–‍1021); Qianxing (乾興; 1022)
	Renzong (仁宗) (Note: Empress Dowager Liu was regent at the beginning of Renzong's rule)	體天法道極功全德神文聖武睿哲明孝皇帝	Zhao Zhen (趙禎)	1010‍–‍1063	1022‍–‍1063	Tiansheng (天聖; 1023‍–‍1032); Mingdao (明道; 1032‍–‍1033); Jingyou (景祐; 1034‍–‍1038); Baoyuan (寶元; 1038‍–‍1040); Kangding (康定; 1040‍–‍1041); Qingli (慶曆; 1041‍–‍1048); Huangyou (皇祐; 1049‍–‍1053); Zhihe (至和; 1054‍–‍1056); Jiayou (嘉祐; 1056‍–‍1063)
	Yingzong (英宗)	體乾應曆隆功盛德憲文肅武睿聖宣孝皇帝	Zhao Shu (趙曙)	1032‍–‍1067	1063‍–‍1067	Zhiping (治平; 1064–1067)
	Shenzong (神宗)	紹天法古運德建功英文烈武欽仁聖孝皇帝	Zhao Xu (趙頊)	1048‍–‍1085	1067‍–‍1085	Xining (熙寧; 1068‍–‍1077); Yuanfeng (元豐; 1078‍–‍1085)
	Zhezong (哲宗)	憲元繼道顯德定功欽文睿武齊聖昭孝皇帝	Zhao Xu (趙煦)	1077‍–‍1100	1085‍–‍1100	Yuanyou (元祐; 1086‍–‍1093); Shaosheng (紹聖; 1094‍–‍1098); Yuanfu (元符; 1098‍–‍1100)
	Huizong (徽宗)	體神合道駿烈遜功聖文仁德慈憲顯孝皇帝	Zhao Ji (趙佶)	1082‍–‍1135	1100‍–‍1125	Jianzhongjingguo (建中靖國; 1101); Chongning (崇寧; 1102‍–‍1106); Daguan (大觀; 1107‍–‍1110); Zhenghe (政和; 1111‍–‍1118); Chonghe (重和; 1118); Xuanhe (宣和; 1119‍–‍1125)
	Qinzong (欽宗)	恭文順德仁孝皇帝	Zhao Huan (趙桓)	1100‍–‍1161	1126‍–‍1127	Jingkang (靖康; 1125‍–‍1127)

Southern Song (1127–1279)
Portrait	Temple name (mainly)	Posthumous name	Birth name	Lifespan	Reign	Era names
	Gaozong (高宗)	受命中興全功至德聖神武文昭仁憲孝皇帝	Zhao Gou (趙構)	1107‍–‍1187	1127‍–‍1162	Jianyan (建炎; 1127‍–‍1130) (Note: In 1129, Emperor Gaozong was briefly forced to abdicate in favour of his two-year-old son Zhao Fu, with the era name Mingshou, but as shortly after Emperor Gaozong was restored by forces loyal to him, Zhao Fu is not usually considered a Song emperor by traditional historians, nor was his era name recognised. But see Bo (1977), pp. 941–942.); Shaoxing (紹興; 1131‍–‍1162)
	Xiaozong (孝宗)	紹統同道冠德昭功哲文神武明聖成孝皇帝	Zhao Shen (趙昚)	1127‍–‍1194	1162‍–‍1189	Longxing (隆興; 1163‍–‍1164); Qiandao (乾道; 1165‍–‍1173); Chunxi (淳熙; 1174‍–‍1189)
	Guangzong (光宗)	循道憲仁明功茂德溫文順武聖哲慈孝皇帝	Zhao Dun (趙惇)	1147‍–‍1200	1189‍–‍1194	Shaoxi (紹熙; 1190‍–‍1194)
	Ningzong (寧宗)	法天備道純德茂功仁文哲武聖睿恭孝皇帝	Zhao Kuo (趙擴)	1168‍–‍1224	1194‍–‍1224	Qingyuan (慶元; 1195‍–‍1200); Jiatai (嘉泰; 1201‍–‍1204); Kaixi (開禧; 1205‍–‍1207); Jiading (嘉定; 1208‍–‍1224)
	Lizong (理宗)	建道備德大功復興烈文仁武聖明安孝皇帝	Zhao Yun (趙昀)	1205‍–‍1264	1224‍–‍1264	Baoqing (寶慶; 1225‍–‍1227); Shaoding (紹定; 1228‍–‍1233); Duanping (端平; 1234‍–‍1236); Jiaxi (嘉熙; 1237‍–‍1240); Chunyou (淳祐; 1241‍–‍1252); Baoyou (寶祐; 1253‍–‍1258); Kaiqing (開慶; 1259); Jingding (景定; 1260‍–‍1264)
	Duzong (度宗)	端文明武景孝皇帝	Zhao Qi (趙祺)	1240‍–‍1274	1264‍–‍1274	Xianchun (咸淳; 1265‍–‍1274)
	Gong (恭帝)	孝恭懿圣皇帝	Zhao Xian (趙顯)	1271‍–‍1323	1275-1276	Deyou (德祐; 1275‍–‍1276)
	Duanzong (端宗)	裕文昭武愍孝皇帝	Zhao Shi (趙昰)	1268‍–‍1278	1276‍–‍1278	Jingyan (景炎; 1276‍–‍1278)
	Huaizong (懷宗) (Note: Unofficially)	—N/a (Note: Often referred to as Emperor Shao of Song (宋少帝)，Emperor Bing of Song (宋昺帝), or Song Mozhu (宋末主).)	Zhao Bing (趙昺)	1271‍–‍1279	1278‍–‍1279	Xiangxing (祥興; 1278‍–‍1279)

== See also ==
- Family tree of Song dynasty monarchs
