= Lu Xiufu =

Chinese statesman and military commander (1236–1279)

- 陸秀夫
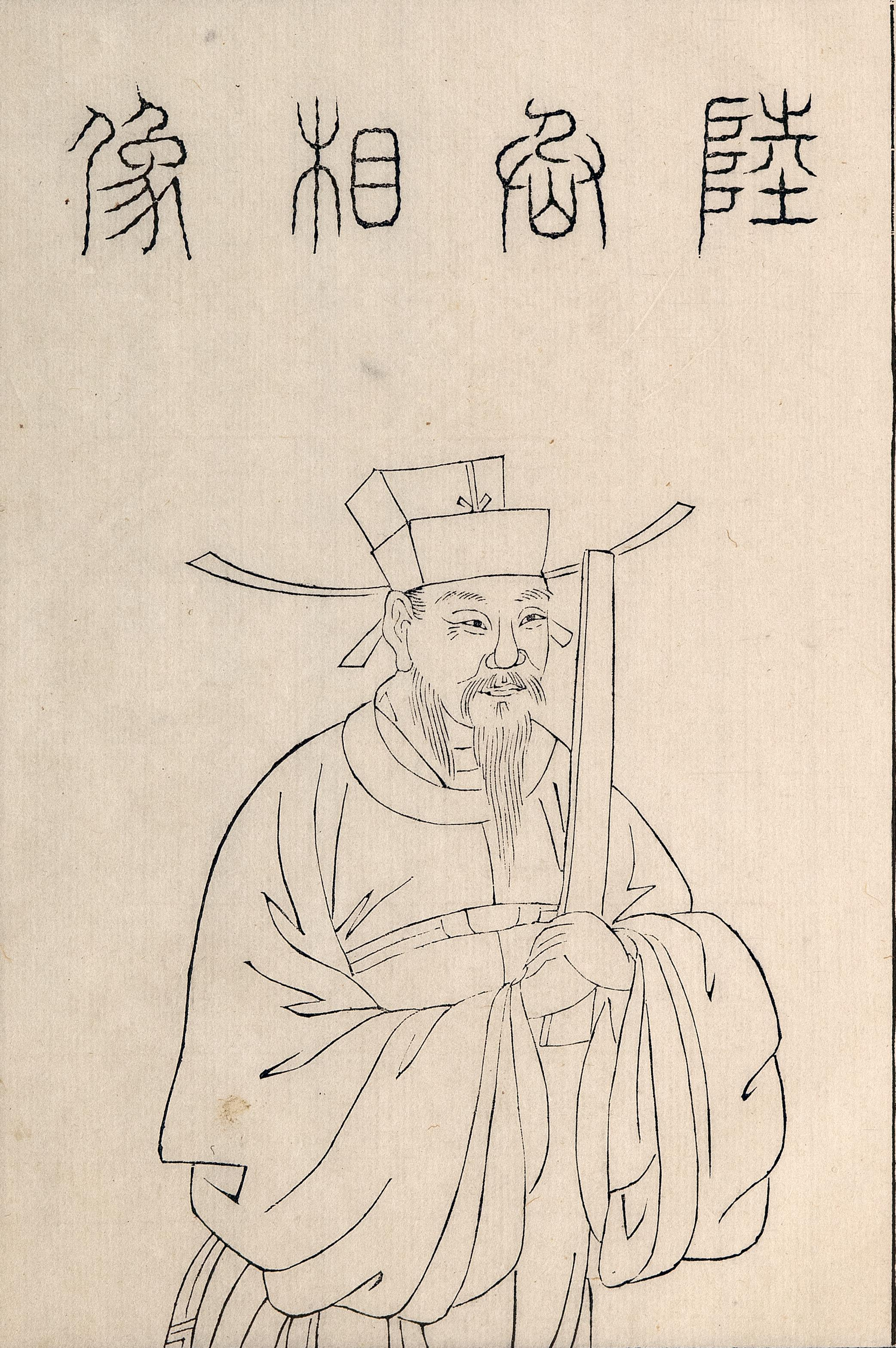

Grand Chancellor of the Left
- In office 10 May 1278 – 19 March 1279
- Monarch: Emperor Shao
- Preceded by: Chen Yizhong

Secretary of the Privy Court
- In office 1276
- Monarch: Emperor Duanzong
- Preceded by: Xia Shilin, Jia Xuanweng and Jia Yuqing

Personal details
- Born: 8 November 1236 Yancheng, Chuzhou, Huainan East Circuit, Song
- Died: March 19, 1279 (aged 42) Yamen, Xinhui County, Guangnan East Circuit, Song
- Resting place: Tomb of Liu Xiufu
Lu Xiufu
- Traditional Chinese: 陸秀夫
- Simplified Chinese: 陆秀夫
Transcriptions
Standard Mandarin
- Hanyu Pinyin: Lù Xiùfū
Courtesy name
- Traditional Chinese: 君實
- Simplified Chinese: 君实
Transcriptions
Standard Mandarin
- Hanyu Pinyin: Jūnshí

Lu Xiufu (8 November 1236 – 19 March 1279), courtesy name Junshi (君實), was a Chinese statesman and military commander who lived in the final years of the Song dynasty. Originally from Yancheng (present-day Jianhu County) in Jiangsu Province, along with Wen Tianxiang and Zhang Shijie, he is regarded as one of the 'Three Loyal Princes of the Song' (大宋三忠王).

== Biography ==
In 1256, together with Wen Tianxiang, Lu passed the imperial examination, thus becoming a "presented scholar", and thereafter joined the Ministry of Rites as a vice-minister.

=== Yuan conquest ===
On 18 January 1276, the general Bayan of the Mongol-led Yuan dynasty showed up with his army outside Lin'an. In a desperate attempt to make peace, the Song imperial court sent Lu Xiufu to negotiate but he was forced to surrender and then was released.

The capital of the Southern Song dynasty at Lin'an in Zhejiang fell to Yuan invaders from the north in 1276, and the five-year-old Emperor Gong was taken prisoner. Together with Chen Yizhong, Zhang Shijie and Consort Yang, amongst others, Lu took care of the two sons of Emperor Duzong, seven-year-old Zhao Shi (赵昰) and four-year-old Zhao Bing (赵昺). Later the same year at Fuzhou in Fujian Province, Zhao Shi was enthroned and began ruling under the era name "Jingyan" (景炎; literally: "bright flame"). Emperor Duanzong appointed Lu as military advisor to the Privy Council with the task of continuing resistance to Yuan forces.

After Emperor Duanzong died at the age of ten in 1278, Lu and Zhang Shijie together enthroned his younger brother Zhao Bing whilst Consort Yang (now Empress Dowager Yang) effectively ran the court from behind a screen. Lu became Left Chancellor (左丞相) and ran the government together with Zhang Shijie.

In 1279, Yuan forces led by Zhang Hongfan launched a large scale naval offensive against Song forces at Mount Ya (present-day Yamen), forcing Zhao Bing to flee. During the ensuing Battle of Yamen on March 19, 1279, the entire Song army and navy were totally wiped out. When the seven-year-old emperor Zhao Bing saw the outcome of the naval battle, he was shocked and slightly rebuked the disorder of his armed forces by saying "they should have coordinated their attack and fought as a unit."

Lu, unwilling to be taken captive by Yuan troops, first ordered his younger wife to commit suicide then advised Zhao Bing:

The affairs of our nation lie in ruins and our country is destroyed. Your Majesty, please do not continue the disastrous policies of your predecessor Emperor Gong whose presence in Dadu is an unbearable shame, we cannot again bear such an insult.

With that, Lu gave the young emperor his seal, picked him up in his arms and jumped from a cliff into the sea, killing them both. Many imperial concubines and ministers also died and by July there were tens of thousands of corpses floating in the sea. Their deaths marked the end of the Song dynasty and the unification of China proper under the Yuan dynasty.

== Legacy ==
Lu's descendants moved through many places before settling down in Qiangang Village (钱岗村), Conghua City, Guangdong Province.

Today in Jiangmen City, Guangdong Province there stands a memorial hall to the 'Three Loyal Princes of the Song' (大宋三忠王). There is also a shrine to the three heroes in the Shuangxi District of New Taipei City, Taiwan. Built in 1868 during the reign of the Tongzhi Emperor in the Qing dynasty, the Three Loyalists Temple (三忠廟/三宗庙) is the religious center of the township.

== See also ==
- History of the Song dynasty
- Society of the Song dynasty
- Culture of the Song dynasty
- List of emperors of the Song dynasty
