= Chen Yizhong =

Duke of Xinguo Chén Yízhōng 陳宜中

chancellor
- Monarch: Emperor Gongdi

Chén Yízhōng (simplified Chinese: 陈宜中; traditional Chinese: 陳宜中) (dates of birth and death unknown), was a chancellor of the Chinese Empire during the final years of the Song Dynasty.

== Life ==
Raised in a poor family in Wenzhou City, Zhejiang Province, Chen was nevertheless an able student, becoming a "supreme scholar" (太学生, student of the imperial academy). Along with six of his classmates including Huang Yong (黄镛) and Lin Zezu (林则祖) Chen sent a letter to politician Ding Daquan (丁大全) accusing him of mishandling defences against Mongol invaders from the north. As a result, Ding cancelled all the students' qualifications. Banished to a military outpost in Jianchang County in Liaoning Province, the six students became known as the "six nobles" (六君子).
In 1263, the third year of Emperor Lizong of Song's Jingding 景定 Era, Chen was placed second in the Imperial examinations. Thereafter he became a government civil servant in Shaoxing City, Zhejiang Province. Later Chen moved to the Imperial censor's office where Chancellor Jia Sidao encouraged him to accuse Chen Yuanfeng (程元凤/程元鳳) of misconduct. In the spring of 1275 CE, Jia Sidao was sacked from his position and Chen appointed Prime Minister by Grand Empress Dowager Xie (謝太皇太后), who held power on behalf of the underage Emperor Gong of Song.

The Song army were defeated by the Mongols at Jiaoshan, Jiangsu Province in April 1276, the second year of Emperor Gong's Deyou 德祐 era. A man named Han Zhen 韩震 suggested relocating the capital whereupon Chen personally murdered his family. Timid and afraid, Chen wavered between advocating war and suing for peace. Top scholar Liu Jiugao (刘九皋) and others wrote a letter criticizing Chen's mismanagement of his country's affairs in ten points. The letter claimed that the Prime Minister was a hesitant and vacillating army commander who could not direct his soldiers properly - "Zhang Shijie's brave infantry are at sea whilst the navy is on the march". The indictment also stated "Chen's orders are inappropriate and we face defeat, his mistakes in governance of the country are neverending!". When Cheng learned of these accusations he quit his post and fled but his mother later persuaded him to return to the court where he became Minister of the East (右丞相).

In December of the same year, Chen despatched minister Liu Yue (柳岳) to approach the camp of the advancing Mongol army and sue for peace but its commander Bayan of the Baarin refused to negotiate. Chen then sent Lu Xiufu with an offer of money but Bayan refused to accept it. In the first lunar month of the second year of the Deyou era (1277 by the Julian Calendar), the Mongol Army arrived at Nieiting Mountain (臬亭山), in the northern suburbs of modern-day Hangzhou, Zhejiang Province. On the 18th of the same month, Dowager Empress Xie sent minister Yang Yingkui (杨应奎) into the Mongol army camp to surrender and offer up the Imperial Seal. The soon to be Yuan Dynasty leaders requested talks with Prime Minister Chen but that night he fled to Lin'an (modern day Hangzhou) then later to Wenzhou in the south east. During November 1276, the first year of Emperor Duanzong of Song's Jingyan 景炎 Era, the Mongol army entered Fuzhou in Fujian Province and the government surrendered. Chen and Zhang Shijie accompanied Emperor Duanzong to the sea when not long afterwards Chen again fled.

By the time of the destruction of the Southern Song Dynasty, Chen had already taken his wife and children to Champa (in modern-day Vietnam).
