= Chiwan =

Bay area in Shenzhen, China

Coordinates: 22°28′32″N 113°52′52″E

- Simplified Chinese: 赤湾
- Traditional Chinese: 赤灣
Transcriptions
Standard Mandarin
- Hanyu Pinyin: Chìwān
Yue: Cantonese
- Jyutping: cek3 waan1

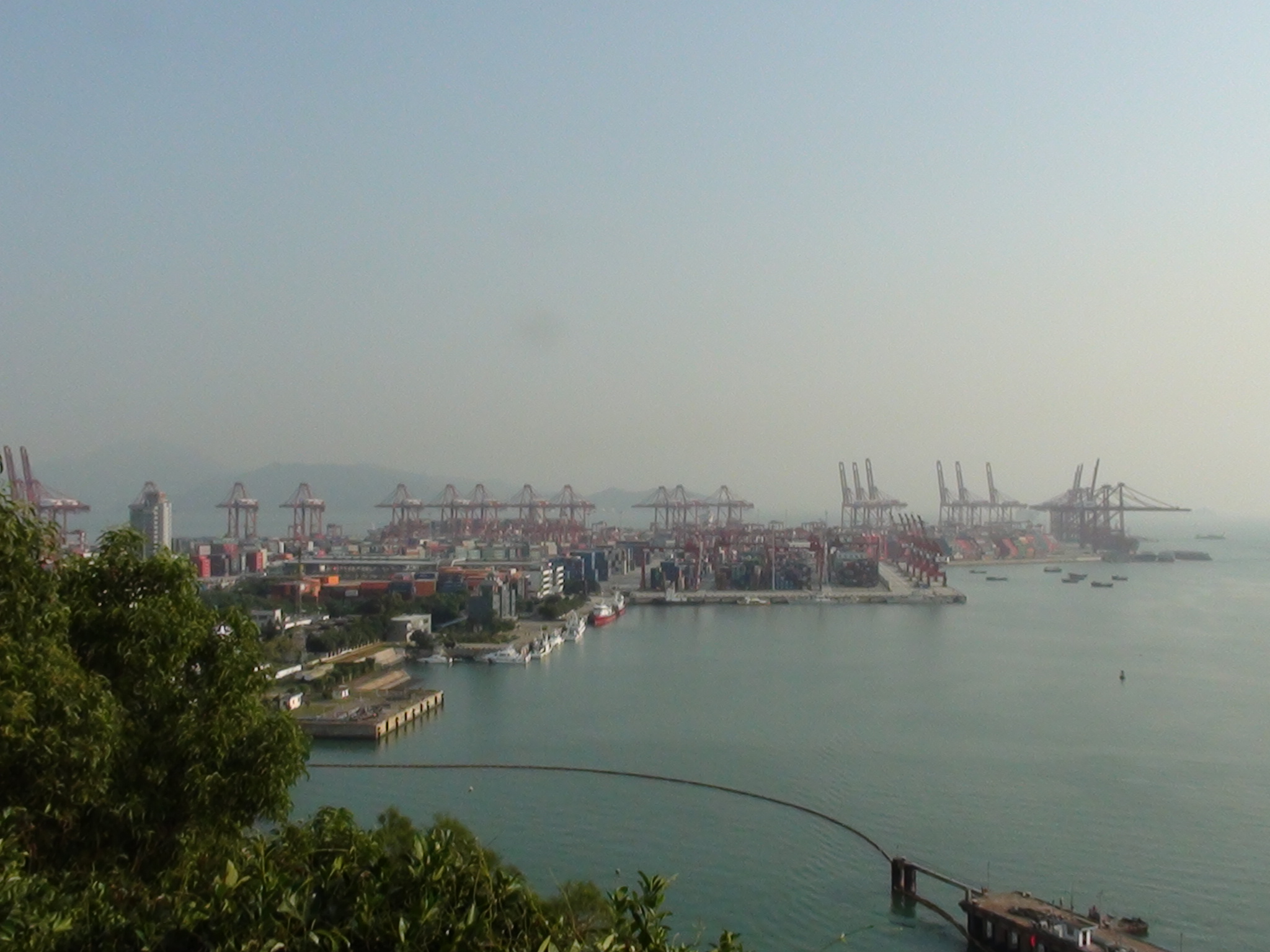
Port of Chiwan

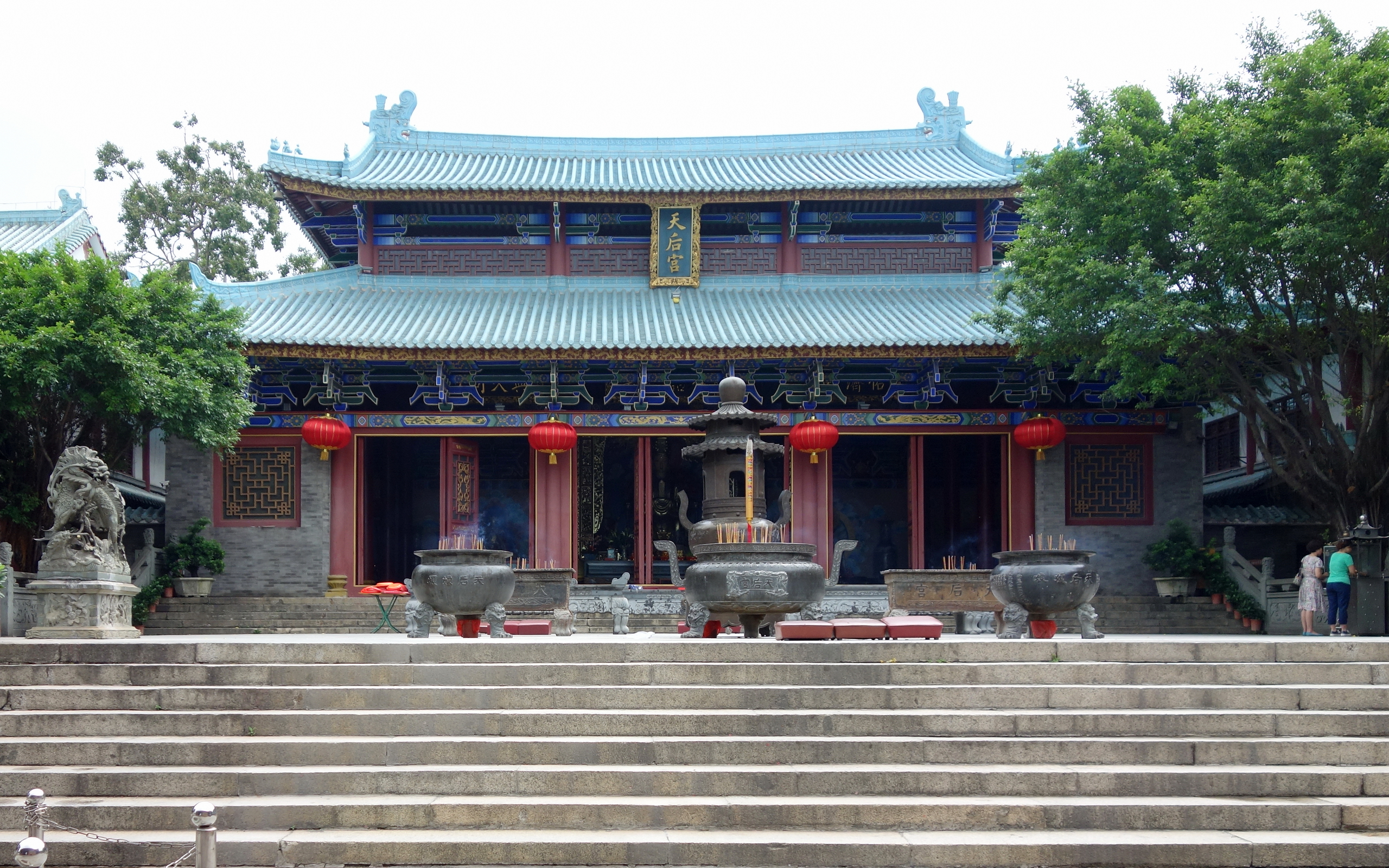
Chiwan Tianhou Temple

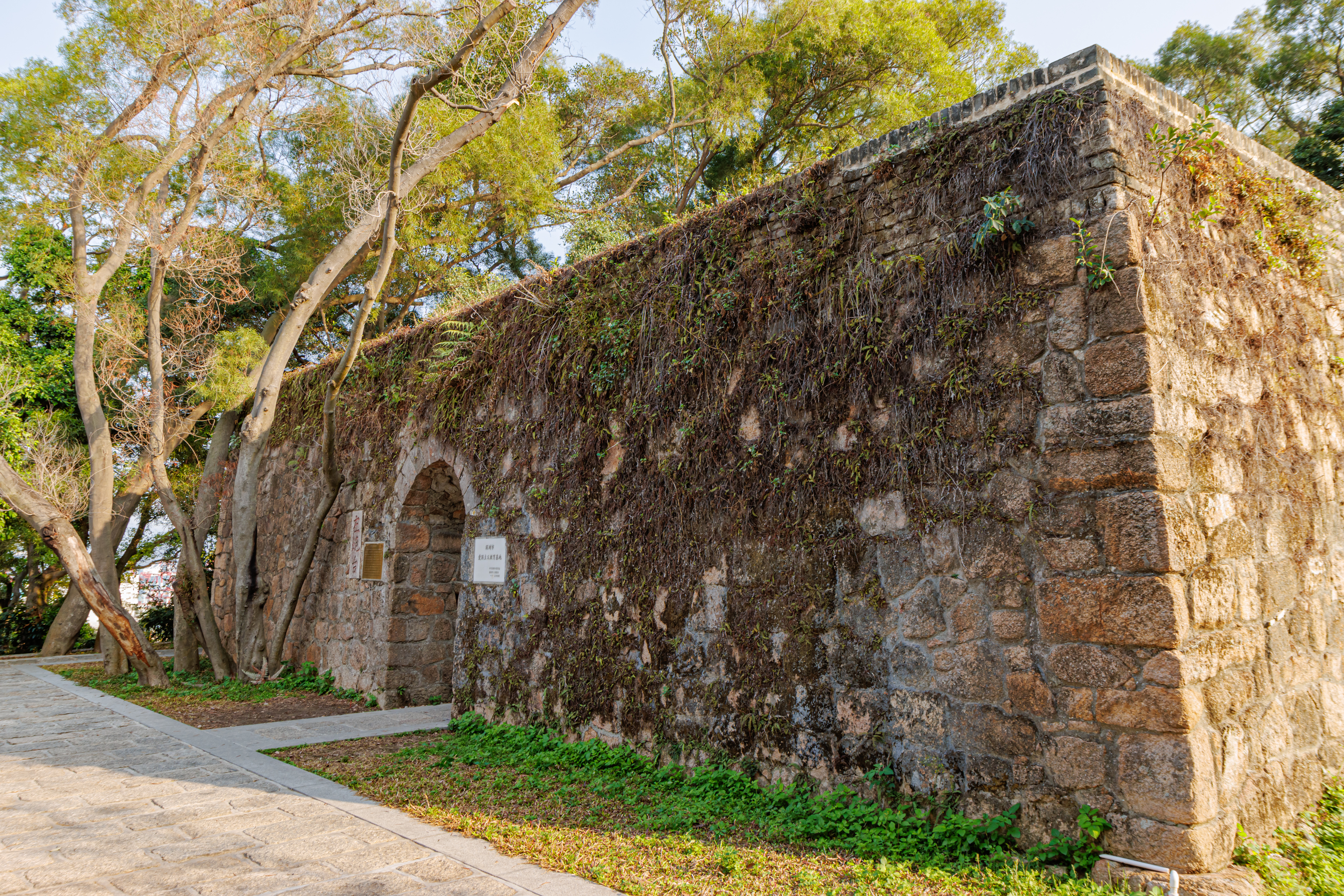
Chiwan Left Fort

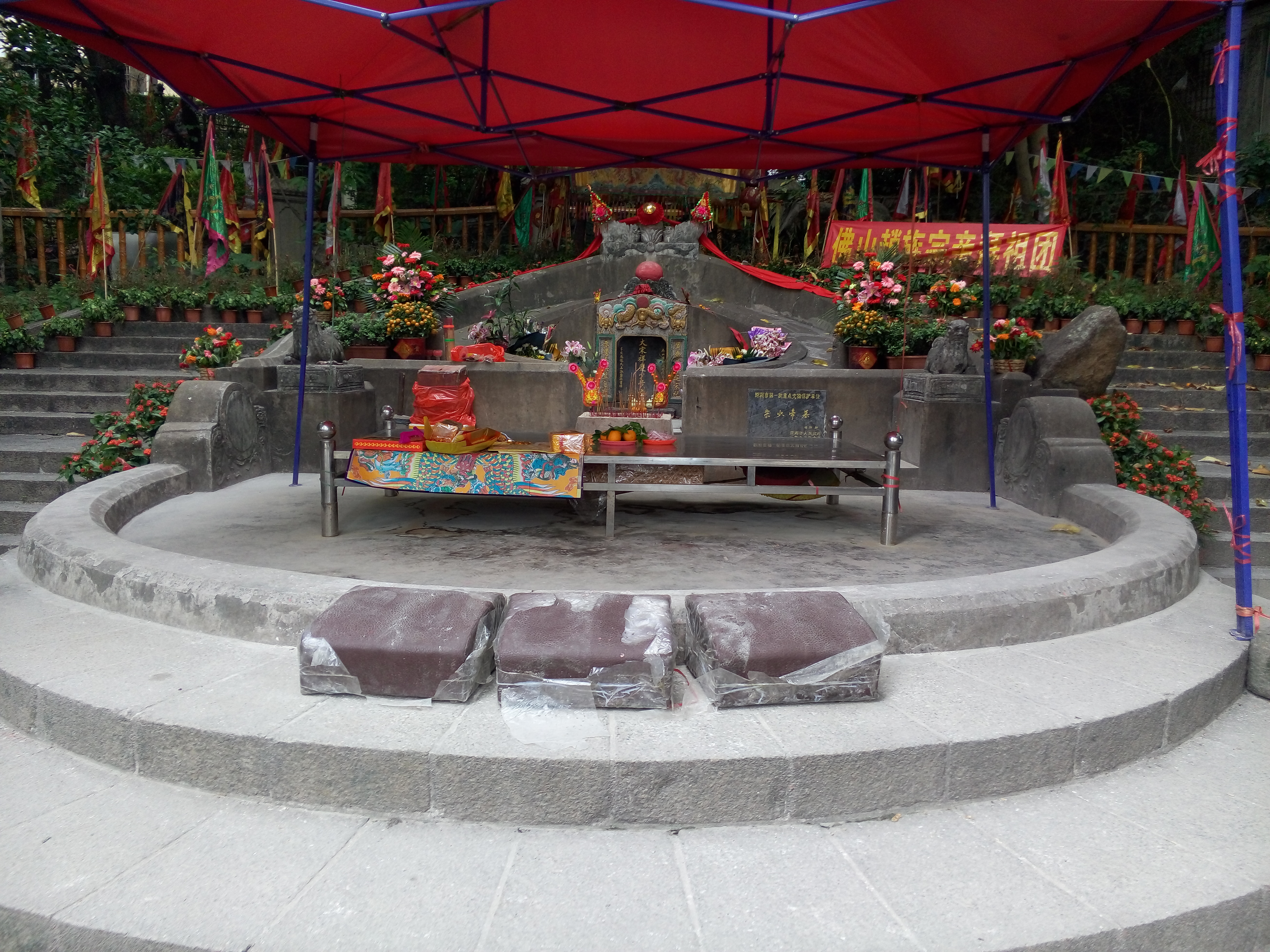
Songshaodi's Tomb

Chiwan (Chinese: 赤湾; Cantonese: Chik Wan) is a bay area surrounded by Chiwan hill at the east, Xiaonanshan hill at the north, and Ying Zui hill at the southeast, in Nanshan district, Shenzhen, China.

== Chiwan Port ==
Chiwan Port (赤湾港) or Chiwan Container Terminal (赤湾集装箱码头) is part of the Port of Shenzhen. CCT is a sino-foreign joint venture company invested by Chiwan Wharf Holdings Limited, Kerry Properties (HK) Limited, China Merchants Holdings (International) Co., Ltd and Modern Terminal Limited (Modern Terminals). The port of Chiwan is used by ships for crew changes, especially container ships, bulk carriers, OSVs - offshore supply and support vessels and off shore craft involved in the exploration of oil in the South China Sea.

== Places of historic interest ==
- Chiwan Left Fort (赤湾左炮台) is located on Yingzui Hill, Chiwan. It was constructed in 1717 and was among the forts used by Lin Zexu during the First Opium War
- Chiwan Tianhou Temple (赤湾天后宫) dates back to the Song Dynasty. It was said to be built as an offering to Mazu for protecting the fleet of Zheng He. It was rebuilt over the following centuries and the present structure was constructed in the early 1990s. It is the largest temple complex dedicated to Tianhou in Guangdong.
- Song Shaodi's Tomb (宋少帝陵) is the tomb of the last Song Dynasty Emperor, the 7-year-old Emperor Bing.
- Chiwan Beacon (赤湾烟墩), built in 1394 at the peak of Xiaonanshan hill, was used in the following centuries as a military facility to issue alerts for potential military attacks.

== Education ==
There is a combined elementary and junior high school, Shenzhen Nanshan Chiwan School (深圳市南山区赤湾学校).

A K-12 boarding school called Broadstone Academy Shenzhen will open in 2022. It will have a bilingual curriculum.

== See also ==
- Shekou, a residential and formerly industrial area east of Chiwan
- Chiwan Station, the Shenzhen Metro station serving the area
