= Battle of Yamen =

1279 naval battle between the Song and Yuan dynasties

- Part of the Song-Yuan Wars
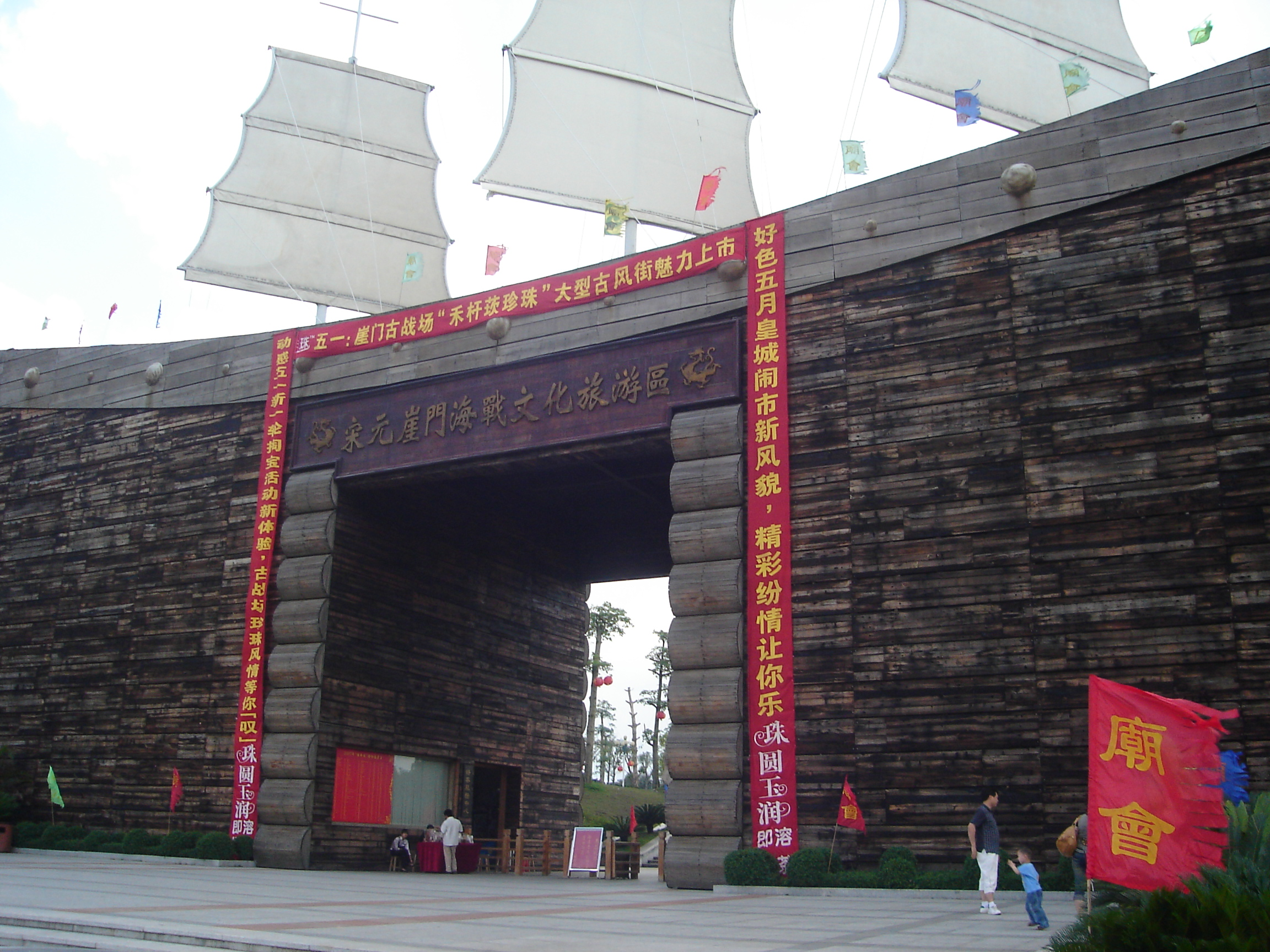
- A park in commemoration of the battle in Xinhui, Jiangmen, Guangdong
Date	19 March 1279
Location	Yamen, Guangdong, China 22°16′N 113°05′E
Result	Yuan victory; Death of Song emperor Zhao Bing; Fall of the Song dynasty
Territorial changes	Yuan annexes all of China proper

Belligerents
Song dynasty	Yuan dynasty

Commanders and leaders
Zhang Shijie †; Lu Xiufu †	Zhang Hongfan

Strength
200,000 people (mostly non-combatant court officials and servants); 1,000+ ships (mostly transport ships with warship escorts); True fighting capacity likely in the 10,000s of soldiers	20,000 Chinese soldiers 50+ warships

Casualties and losses
At least 100,000 died either from fighting or drowning; the rest fled	Unknown
- Location within China

Battle of Yamen
- Traditional Chinese: 厓門戰役
- Simplified Chinese: 崖门战役
Transcriptions
Standard Mandarin
- Hanyu Pinyin: Yámén Zhànyì

Battle of Yashan
- Traditional Chinese: 厓山海戰
- Simplified Chinese: 崖山海战
Transcriptions
Standard Mandarin
- Hanyu Pinyin: Yáshān Hǎizhàn

The Battle of Yamen (Chinese: 厓門戰役), also known as the Battle of Yashan (Chinese: 厓山海戰), was a naval battle which took place in southern China on 19 March 1279. It is considered to be the last stand of the Song dynasty against the invading forces of the Mongol-led Yuan dynasty.

Today, the battle site is located in the town of Yamen, in Xinhui County, Jiangmen, Guangdong.

== Background ==
In 1276, the Southern Song court, in their rush to flee the capital city of Lin'an to avoid Yuan forces approaching Fuzhou, left Emperor Gong behind to be captured. Hopes of resistance centered on two young princes, Gong's brothers. The older boy, Zhao Shi, was declared emperor. In 1277, when Fuzhou fell to the Yuan dynasty, the exiled Southern Song dynasty fled to Quanzhou, where Zhang Shijie, the Grand General of Song, hoped to borrow boats to continue their flight. However, the Muslim merchant Pu Shougeng refused their request, prompting Zhang to confiscate Pu's properties and flee on stolen boats with the Southern Song court. In fury, Pu slaughtered imperial clan members and many officials in Quanzhou and surrendered to the Yuan, strengthening the Yuan's naval power.

At this point of the war, it was obvious that the Song did not have sufficient strength to risk fighting the Yuan in a head-on conflict. Zhang Shijie decided to build a vast fleet with what remained, to allow the Song court and soldiers to move from place to place until the situation improved. The Song court sailed to Guangdong from Quanzhou. However, Zhao Shi's boat capsized in a storm on the way to Leizhou. Although he survived, he fell ill because of this ordeal. The imperial court later sought refuge in Lantau Island's Mui Wo, where Zhao Shi eventually died; he was succeeded by his younger sibling, Zhao Bing, who was seven. Zhang Shijie brought the new emperor to Yamen and prepared the defense against the Yuan there.

In 1278, Wen Tianxiang, who had fought against the Yuan in Guangdong and Jiangxi, was captured by Wang Weiyi in Haifeng County, eliminating all the Song land forces nearby.

== Battle ==
In 1279, Zhang Hongfan of the Yuan attacked the Song navy in Yamen. Li Heng, who previously had captured Guangzhou, reinforced Zhang Hongfan. Some within the Song forces suggested that the navy should first claim the mouth of the bay, to secure their line of retreat to the west. Zhang Shijie turned down this suggestion in order to prevent his soldiers from fleeing the battle. He then ordered the burning of all palaces, houses and forts on land for the same reason.

Zhang Shijie ordered about 1,000 ships to be chained together, forming a long string within the bay, and placed Zhao Bing's boat in the center of his fleet. This was done to prevent individual Song ships from fleeing the battle. The Yuan forces steered fire ships into the Song formation, but the Song ships were prepared for such an attack: all Song ships had been painted with fire-resistant mud. The Yuan navy then blockaded the bay, while the Yuan army cut off the Song's fresh water and wood sources on land. The Song side, with many non-combatants, soon ran out of supplies. The Song soldiers were forced to eat dry foods and drink sea water, causing nausea and vomiting. Zhang Hongfan even kidnapped Zhang Shijie's nephew, asking Zhang Shijie to surrender on three occasions, to no avail.

In the afternoon of 18 March, Zhang Hongfan prepared for a massive assault. The employment of cannons was turned down because Hongfan felt that cannons could break the chains of the formation too effectively, making it easy for the Song ships to retreat. The next day Zhang Hongfan split his naval forces into four parts: one each for the Song's east, north, and south sides, while Hongfan led the remaining portion to about a li away from the Song forces.

First, the north flank engaged the Song forces but were repulsed. The Yuan then began playing festive music, leading the Song to think that the Yuan forces were having a banquet and lowering their guard. At noon Zhang Hongfan attacked from the front, hiding additional soldiers under large pieces of cloth. Once Zhang Hongfan's boats neared the Song fleet, the Yuan sounded the horn of battle, revealing the soldiers under the fabric.

The Song troops were prepared for a small skirmish, not a large assault. Waves of arrows hit the Song ships. Caught off guard, the Song fleet immediately lost seven ships, along with a great number of troops in the process. The ill and weakened Song soldiers were no match for the Yuan troops in close combat, and the chaotic environment made battle command impossible. The chained Song ships could neither support the middle nor retreat. After the Song troops were killed, the bloody slaughter of the Song court began. Seeing that the battle was lost, Zhang Shijie picked out his finest soldiers and cut about a dozen ships from the formation in an attempted breakout to save the emperor.

The Yuan forces quickly advanced to the center and to Zhao Bing, killing everyone in their way. There, Prime Minister Lu Xiufu saw no hope of breaking free and, taking the boy emperor with him, jumped into the sea, where both drowned. Many officials and concubines followed suit.

== Aftermath ==
The History of Song records that, seven days after the battle, thousands of corpses floated to the surface of the sea. Reportedly, the body of the boy emperor was found near today's Shekou in Shenzhen, though his actual grave has yet to be found.

Zhang Shijie, having escaped the battle, hoped to have Dowager Yang appoint the next Song emperor, and from there continue to resist the Yuan dynasty. However, after hearing of Emperor Huaizong's death, Dowager Yang also committed suicide at sea. Zhang Shijie buried her at the shore. He and his remaining soldiers were assumed to have drowned at sea, as a tropical storm whipped up soon afterwards. However, there have been suggestions that his death was simply Mongolian propaganda, since no remains or trace of his fleet were ever found.

As Zhao Bing was the last Song emperor, his death effectively ended the Song dynasty and the House of Zhao completely lost power over China, leaving the Yuan dynasty, under Kublai Khan, with all of the country under its control. Kublai Khan and his successors and followers would rule China for 97 years until the rise of the Ming dynasty under the Hongwu Emperor, when the Chinese regained control of their lost territory from the Mongols.

Despite Pu Shougeng defecting from the Song to the Yuan, towards the end of the Yuan dynasty, the Yuan Mongols turned against Pu Shougeng's family and the Muslims and slaughtered Pu Shougeng's descendants in the Ispah rebellion. Mosques and other buildings with foreign architecture were almost all destroyed and the Yuan imperial soldiers killed most of the descendants of Pu Shougeng and horrifically mutilated their corpses.

A rock was carved in memory of Zhang Hongfan there. Many temples were built in the surrounding area in memory of those who lost their lives in the dying years of the Song dynasty, including Wen Tianxiang, Lu Xiufu and Zhang Shijie. In the 1980s, another memorial was built near Shekou to commemorate Zhao Bing. The preparation of a leafy greens soup dish, patriotic soup, has also become a way to memorialize the boy emperor by the Teochew people. Today, a museum complex, the Song-Yuan Yamen Sea Warfare Culture Tourist Zone, lies just to the east of the battle site.

== See also ==
- Largest naval battle in history
- Military history of the Song dynasty
- Naval history of China
