= Zhang Hongfan =

Chinese military general (1238-1280)

Zhang Hongfan (Chinese: 張弘範; pinyin: Zhāng Hóngfàn; Wade–Giles: Chang Hung-fan; 1238 – 11 February 1280) was a Chinese military general of the Mongol Empire and the Yuan dynasty. As commander of the Yuan army and navy, he annihilated the Southern Song dynasty by crushing the last Song resistance at the Battle of Yamen in 1279, where he is said to have captured 8,000 enemy vessels. He is also known for capturing the Song loyalist Wen Tianxiang.

Zhang was born in Dingxing, in present-day Hebei province, which was part of the Mongol Empire at the time of his birth. His father, Zhang Rou, led local forces defending against the Mongols in the final days of the Jin dynasty, but switched his allegiance to the Mongols in 1218 and was later ennobled by the Yuan dynasty.

Although some later books and retellings claim that Zhang was a traitor who turned against the Southern Song dynasty, this is not historically accurate, since Zhang's place of birth had not been part of the Southern Song dynasty and his family had served the Jin dynasty and then the Mongol Empire. Some historians claim that Zhang was related to Zhang Shijie, the Southern Song general who lost the Battle of Yamen against the Yuan dynasty before dying in a storm, as Zhang Shijie's family was also from present-day Hebei under Jin rule.

Deng Guangjian, a fellow townsman of Wen Tianxiang, was tutor to Zhang Hongfan's family after he was rescued from attempting to drown himself at the Battle of Yamen. In his biography of Wen Tianxiang, Deng Guangjian describes Zhang Hongfan as courteous and friendly towards Wen after his capture. On his deathbed, Zhang had also pleaded with the Yuan emperor Kublai Khan to spare the life of Wen Tianxiang. Aside from these descriptions in Wen's biography, Deng also wrote a preface to Zhang's various collected writings.
