= Emperor Duanzong =

Emperor of Song China from 1276 to 1278

Emperor Duanzong of Song 宋端宗
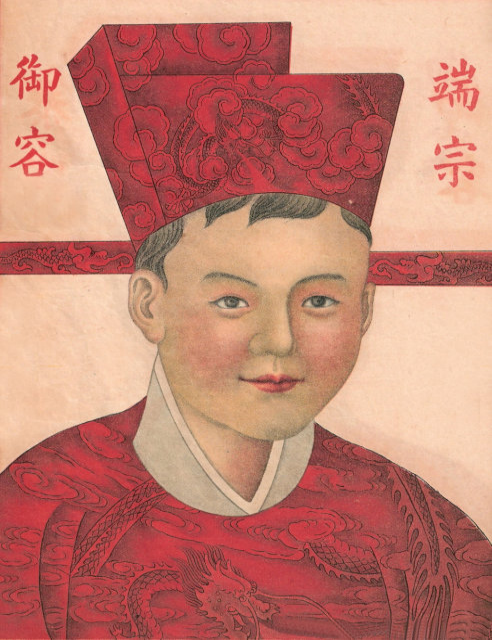

Emperor of the Song dynasty
- Reign: 15 June 1276 – 8 May 1278
- Coronation: 14 June 1276
- Predecessor: Emperor Gong
- Successor: Zhao Bing
- Born: Zhao Shi; 10 July 1270; Lin'an, Song dynasty (modern-day Hangzhou, Zhejiang)
- Died: 8 May 1278 (aged 7); Gangzhou, Song dynasty (modern-day Jiangmen, Guangdong)
- Burial: Yongfu Mausoleum (永福陵, in present-day Tung Chung, Hong Kong)
Era dates
- Jingyan (景炎; 1276–1278)
Posthumous name
- Emperor Yuwen Zhaowu Minxiao (裕文昭武愍孝皇帝) or Emperor Xiaogong Renyu Cisheng Ruiwen Yingwu Qinzheng (孝恭仁裕慈聖睿文英武勤政皇帝)
Temple name
- Duanzong (端宗)
- House: Zhao
- Dynasty: Song (Southern Song)
- Father: Emperor Duzong
- Mother: Lady Yang

Emperor Duanzong of Song
- Chinese: 宋端宗
- Literal meaning: "Final Ancestor of the Song"
Transcriptions
Standard Mandarin
- Hanyu Pinyin: Sòng Duānzōng
Yue: Cantonese
- Jyutping: sung3 dyun1 zung1

Zhao Shi
- Traditional Chinese: 趙昰
- Simplified Chinese: 赵昰
Transcriptions
Standard Mandarin
- Hanyu Pinyin: Zhào Shì
Yue: Cantonese
- Jyutping: ziu6 si6

Emperor Duanzong of Song (10 July 1270 – 8 May 1278), personal name Zhao Shi, was the 17th emperor of the Song dynasty of China, and the eighth and penultimate emperor of the Southern Song dynasty. He was the fifth son of Emperor Duzong and an elder brother of his predecessor, Emperor Gong and successor Zhao Bing.

Emperor Gong along with Grand Dowager Xie surrendered to the Yuan dynasty in 1276 after the fall of the Southern Song capital, Lin'an (present-day Hangzhou). Zhao Shi and his seventh brother, Zhao Bing, managed to escape southward to Fuzhou, where the new Song capital was established. On June 14, 1276, Zhao Shi was enthroned as the new Emperor Duanzong who ruled under the era name "Jingyan" (景炎; literally: "bright flame"). However, in early 1278, Yuan forces broke through the Song dynasty's last lines of defence, forcing Zhao Shi to flee again. Accompanied by loyal ministers such as Lu Xiufu and Zhang Shijie, Zhao Shi boarded a ship and fled further south to Guangdong Province. In March 1278, while fleeing from Yuan forces led by Liu Shen, in a hurricane, Zhao Shi fell from a boat and almost drowned. Thereafter, he stayed temporarily in Hong Kong which at that time was a small fishing village. He died a few months later in Gangzhou (碙州; present-day Jiangmen) due to illness. He was succeeded by his seventh brother, Zhao Bing, who was enthroned in Mui Wo, the same village where Zhao Shi nearly drowned and died. The body of Zhao Shi is buried in Yongfu Mausoleum (永福陵). The actual area of the tomb is still unknown and undiscovered.

The historical relic Sung Wong Toi in present-day Hong Kong's Kowloon City commemorates Zhao Shi's escape to Hong Kong.

== See also ==
- Chinese emperors family tree (middle)
- List of emperors of the Song dynasty

Emperor Duanzong House of Zhao Born: 1268 Died: 1278
Regnal titles
Preceded by Emperor Gong	Emperor of the Song dynasty 1276–1278	Succeeded by Zhao Bing
