= Zhang Shijie =

Chinese admiral, general and politician (died c.1279)

Zhang Shijie 張世傑
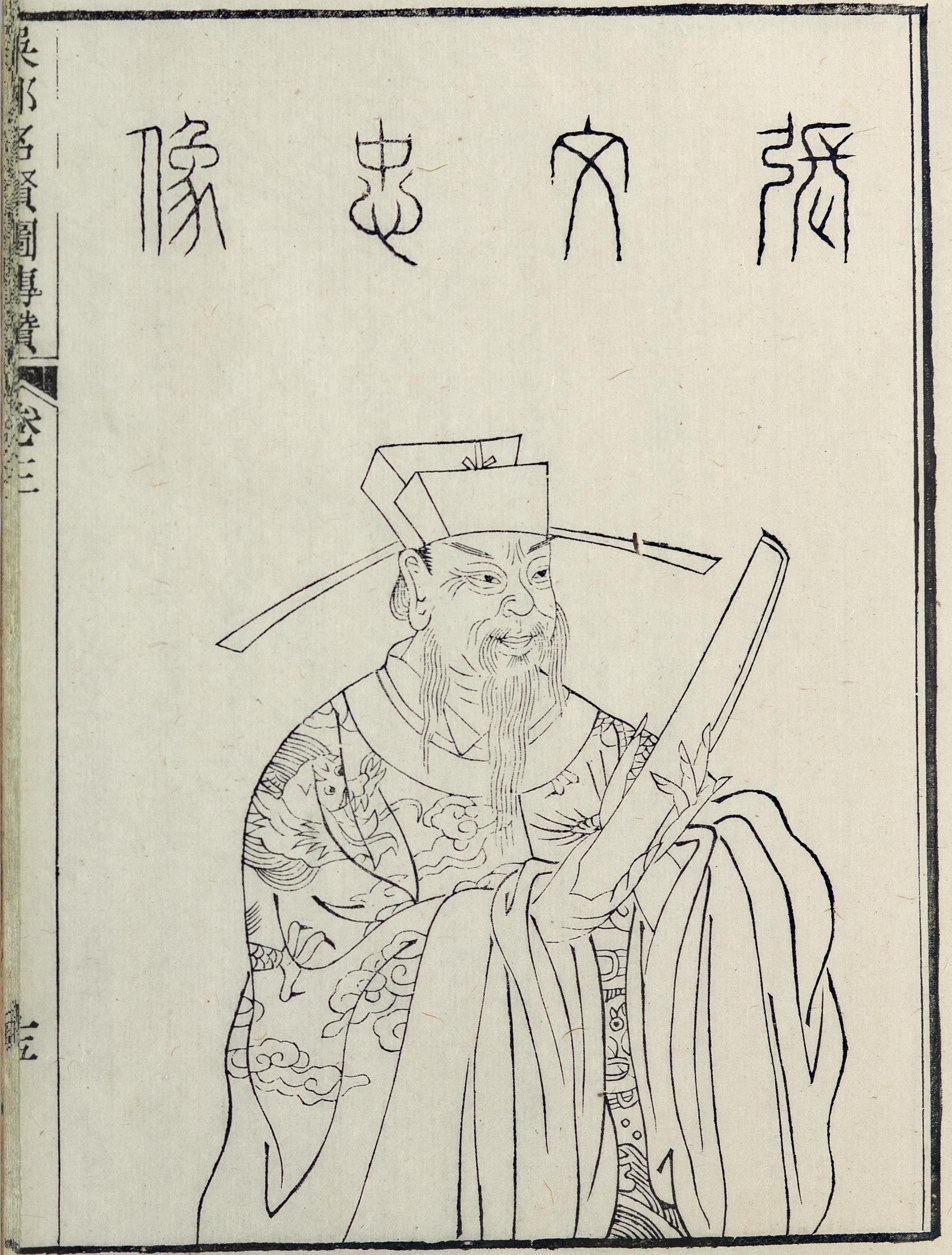

Personal details
- Died: 1279 Yamen, Guangdong, China

Military service
- Battles/wars: Battle of Yamen

Zhang Shijie (Chinese: 張世傑; pinyin: Zhāng Shìjíe) was a Chinese admiral, military general, and politician during the Mongol invasion of China.

Zhang was born to a prosperous family in present-day Hebei (part of the Liao empire, then Jin empire). After the fall of the Jin to the Mongol Empire, Zhang joined the Mongol army and was stationed in present-day Henan province under the command of Zhang Rou, a Han Chinese general of the Mongol Empire.

Zhang Shijie defected from the Mongols to the Southern Song dynasty after he committed a crime, to evade punishment. Zhang Shijie gained his position in the Song administration after passing his civil service examination, eventually becoming a successful administrator overseeing civil, military, and naval duties for the Southern Song.

After the fall of the capital Lin'an (modern-day Hangzhou), Zhang commanded the Song naval forces during the Mongol invasion of China in 1276, and served as the last commander of the Song fleet, during the attempt to escort Emperor Bing of Song and other Imperial officials as they fled the Mongols in 1279. However, Zhang's fleet was intercepted by Mongol forces under the command of Zhang Hongfan (the son of Zhang Shijie's former commander Zhang Rou) off the coast of Xinhui and destroyed at the Battle of Yamen on 19 March 1279. Prime Minister Lu Xiufu committed suicide, drowning the child Emperor with him, following their defeat. Although Zhang Shijie was able to escape with his remaining ships, he was said to have died a few days later during a storm at sea. Along with Lu Xiufu and Wen Tianxiang, Zhang is considered one of the "Three Loyal Princes of the Song".
