= Yamen, Guangdong =

Yamen 崖门镇
- Town
- Location within Guangdong
- Country: China
- Province: Guangdong
- Prefecture-level city: Jiangmen
- District: Xinhui District

Area
  - Total: 318 km^{2} (123 sq mi)

Population (2000)
  - Total: 41,605

Yamen (simplified Chinese: 崖门镇; traditional Chinese: 崖門鎮; pinyin: Yámén Zhèn) is a town in the south of Xinhui District of Jiangmen, Guangdong, China. It covers an area of 318 square kilometres (123 mi^{2}), and had a population of 41,605 per the 2000 Chinese Census.

== History ==
In 1279, the Battle of Yamen took place in the area between the navies of the Song dynasty and the Yuan dynasty.

In 1955, Yamen was placed under the jurisdiction of the now-defunct Anxi District (岸西区). In 1958, Yamen was divided into Yaxi Township (崖西乡) and Tongnan Township (洞南乡). In 1984, these became Yaxi District (崖西区) and Yanan District (崖南区). Two years later, Yaxi and Yanan became towns. On June 22, 2002, the State Council of the People's Republic of China passed a law which changed Xinhui from a county-level city to a district, and merged Yaxi and Yanan into the town of Yamen (崖门镇).

== Administrative divisions ==
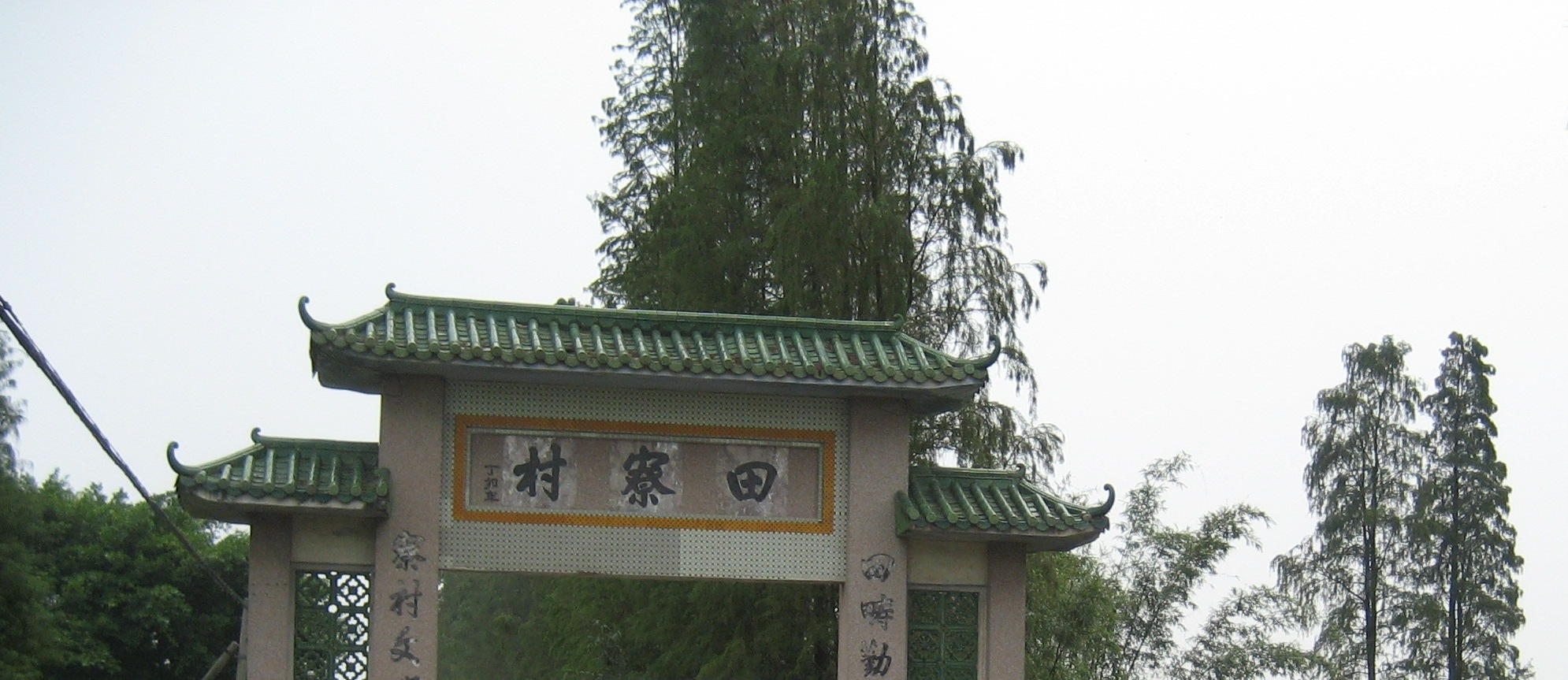
A paifang in Tianliao Village

Yamen administers 2 residential communities (社区) and 17 administrative villages (行政村). In addition to administrative villages, Yamen includes a number of natural villages (自然村), such as Tianliao Village, which have no administrative jurisdiction.

=== Residential communities ===
The 2 residential communities governed by Yamen are Yaxi Community (崖西社区) and Yanan Community (崖南社区).

=== Villages ===
The following 17 administrative villages are governed by Yamen:

- Tianshui Village (甜水村)
- Huangchong Village (黄冲村)
- Jingbei Village (京背村)
- Jingmei Village (京梅村)
- Nanhe Village (南合村)
- Dongnan Village (洞南村)
- Dongbei Village (洞北村)
- Shuibei Village (水背村)
- Kengkou Village (坑口村)
- Jiaobeishi Village (交贝石村)
- Tianbian Village (田边村)
- Gudou Village (古斗村)
- Tiannan Village (田南村)
- Hengshui Village (横水村)
- Longwang Village (龙旺村)
- Mingping Village (明苹村)
- Lianghuangwu Village (梁黄屋村)

== Demographics ==
According to the 2000 Chinese Census, Yaxi and Yanan, the two former towns which comprise present-day Yamen, had populations of 29,634 and 11,971, respectively. Combined, these populations total 41,605.

As of 1996, Yaxi and Yanan had areas of 168.5 square kilometres (65.1 mi^{2}) and 112.8 square kilometres (43.6 mi^{2}), respectively, and populations of about 31,000 and 9,000, respectively. This gives contemporary Yamen an area of 281.3 square kilometres (108.6 mi^{2}), and a population of 40,000, as of 1996.

== Tourism ==
Major tourist sites in Yamen include Gudou Hot Springs and Gudou Mountain.

== Transportation ==
Yamen Bridge connects the town to neighboring Gujing.

== See also ==
- Battle of Yamen
