= Li Xinchuan =

Chinese historian (1167–1244)

- 李心傳
- Born: 1167; Jingyan County, Sichuan, Song China
- Died: 1244 (aged 76–77); Huizhou, Anhui, Song China
- Occupations: Historian, scholar-official
- Notable work: Jianyan yilai xinian yaolu, Jianyan yilai chaoye zaji, Daominglu
- Father: Li Shunchen

Chinese name
- Traditional Chinese: 李心傳
- Simplified Chinese: 李心传
Transcriptions
Standard Mandarin
- Hanyu Pinyin: Lǐ Xīnchuán
- Wade–Giles: Li^{3} Hsin^{1}-chuan^{2}

Courtesy name
- Chinese: 微之
Transcriptions
Standard Mandarin
- Hanyu Pinyin: Wēizhī
- Wade–Giles: Wei^{1}-chih^{1}

Art name
- Traditional Chinese: 秀嚴
- Simplified Chinese: 秀严
Transcriptions
Standard Mandarin
- Hanyu Pinyin: Xiùyán

Li Xinchuan (Chinese: 李心傳; pinyin: Lǐ Xīnchuán, 1167–1244) was a Chinese historian during the Southern Song dynasty. Born to a prodigious scholar-official in southern Sichuan, Li gained an interest in history as a teenager and sought to create a set of annals covering the history of the Southern Song.

Failing the jinshi imperial examinations in 1196, he began private scholarship in Sichuan, compiling historical texts. He became well known for his historical studies and was appointed as the proofreader of the Imperial Library in Lin'an (modern Hangzhou) in 1226, where he began compiling a state history of the Southern Song. He was granted an honorary jinshi degree in 1229, but censured in 1233 and forced to return to Sichuan, where he worked for the provincial government. Forced to return to Lin'an by the Mongol invasions in 1237, he became the director of the Imperial Library in 1238 and resumed work on his state histories. He was censured again for criticizing the state response to the wartime famine and forced to move to Huizhou, Anhui, where he died in 1244.

Li's most famous work is his Jianyan yilai xinian yaolu (建炎以來繫年要錄), chronological annals of the Southern Song from 1127 to 1162. His other surviving works include a supplementary guide to the chronology titled Jianyan yilai chaoye zaji (建炎以來朝野雜記), a short history of the Neo-Confucian movement titled Daominglu, and Jiuwen zhengwu (舊聞證誤), a partially-surviving set of notes on Song history.

== Biography ==
Map of China during the Southern Song dynasty, showing its division between the Song, Jurchen Jin, and Western Xia. Sichuan is on the western frontier of Song territory.

In 1167, Li Xinchuan was born in Jingyan County, situated within the salt-producing region of Longzhou in southern Sichuan. He was the eldest of three brothers. His father, Li Shunchen (李舜臣), was a prodigious scholar who had obtained the jinshi degree (the highest rank in the imperial examination system) in 1166. Although he alienated the Southern Song court officials through his advocacy of a warlike policy towards the Jurchen Jin dynasty and the reclamation of northern China, he gained a position at the Court of the Imperial Clan in 1179. This was likely due to the advocacy of Grand Chancellor Zhao Xiong, who was also from Sichuan. Li moved to Lin'an (the capital of the Southern Song, now Hangzhou) with his three sons–Li Xinchuan, Daochuan (道傳), and Xingchuan (性傳). They were educated in the traditional manner in preparation for the imperial examinations, specializing in the Book of Documents.

Li Xinchuan later recalled developing an interest in history while accompanying his father to the imperial archives in Lin'an; he wrote that he had overheard ministers there lamenting the lack of annals since 1127, when the Jin invasion pushed the Song south. Li Shunchen died in 1182, and his sons returned to Sichuan. The Li brothers studied for the imperial examinations over the next fifteen years, seeking to obtain the jinshi rank themselves. Two of them took the exams in 1196; Li Daochuan passed and became an official, while Li Xinchuan failed after one attempt. (Note: Lai writes that Li failed the examinations multiple times, while Chaffee writes that he attempted to pass only once.) After this, Li Xinchuan returned to Longzhou and in 1197 began working as a private scholar, compiling historical texts over the following decades. Xinchuan was initially overshadowed by his brother Daochuan, who became a noted Neo-Confucianian scholar and loyalist official. Daochuan compiled the main source for the collected sayings of the philosopher Zhu Xi.

In 1200, Li completed his first book, the now-lost Dushi kao. Eight years later, he presented his major historical work, Jianyan yilai xinian yaolu, and gained acclaim as a historian. He gained the courtesy name Weizhi 微之 and the art name Xiuyan (秀嚴). In 1205, an acquaintance warned Li that some powerful political figures were hostile to the compilation of private histories. As a result, he ceased work on these until the death of the autocratic Grand Chancellor Han Tuozhou in 1207.

Li's reputation as a scholar grew across the Song empire. Following the ascension of Emperor Lizong in 1224, a group of 23 officials—including Neo-Confucian scholar Wei Liaoweng—petitioned for him to be appointed to an official position. In 1226, he came to Lin'an and was appointed to be the proofreader for the Imperial Library, where he was commissioned to work on official histories of the Southern Song. Still a commoner at the time of his appointment, he was granted officialdom in 1227, and two years later was granted the jinshi degree; imperial records state that this was conferred due to the emperor's appreciation for one of his memorials to the throne.

In 1233, Li was indicted by the Censorate and forced to return to Sichuan. This was possibly due to his advocacy for Neo-Confucianism; according to the History of Song, Emperor Lizong asked Li in 1232 to recommend scholars who had previously declined offers of court positions. He recommended Li Fan, whom Li saw as the greatest living Neo-Confucian scholar. As Li Fan had left his administrative posts in protest against Councillor Shi Miyuan's administration, the suggestion may have been interpreted as a protest against Shi. Although the Emperor reportedly approved of Li Xinchuan's suggestion, it was not acted upon, and Li Fan died shortly after. Soon after returning home, Li was ordered to the Sichuan capital of Chengdu to assist the provincial government in compiling a state compendium.

Li was recalled to court in 1236, possibly to allow him to leave Sichuan, which had become the front-line of the Mongol invasion. He returned to Lin'an in 1237 as part of a wave of Sichuan scholar-officials fleeing the conflict. He was appointed as the assistant director of the Imperial Library the following year and resumed work on the state histories. He was promoted to the director of the library later in 1238.

In 1240, famine struck Lin'an, exacerbated by the Mongol invasions, resulting in widespread death and cannibalism. Li wrote another memorial, blaming the famine on a lack of war preparations and incompetence by self-serving officials, and advocating that the emperor fire many of his advisors. For this, Li was again censured and sent to Huizhou, Anhui, where he was given a sinecure (a salaried position without official duties), serving as the guardian of a temple.

Li's successor as compiler of the state histories, Gao Dingzi, submitted them to the court at the request of chancellor Shi Songzhi. Shi censored portions of the text relating to his uncle Shi Miyuan's installment of Emperor Lizong as heir to the throne. Several officials, including Li, opposed this change. After this, Li had his sinecure removed and was sent into official retirement in 1242. He died in Huizhou in 1244. Li had no sons, and it is unknown if he was married. As such, one of his brother Daochuan's sons served as his heir.

== Bibliography ==
Li wrote eleven histories, nine of which focused on the Southern Song dynasty. He also wrote four books on the Chinese classics and a collected volume of his shorter writings. Only four of these books, all histories of portions of the Song dynasty, survive. These works mainly survive through their inclusion in the 1407 Yongle Encyclopedia.

=== Chronological Record ===
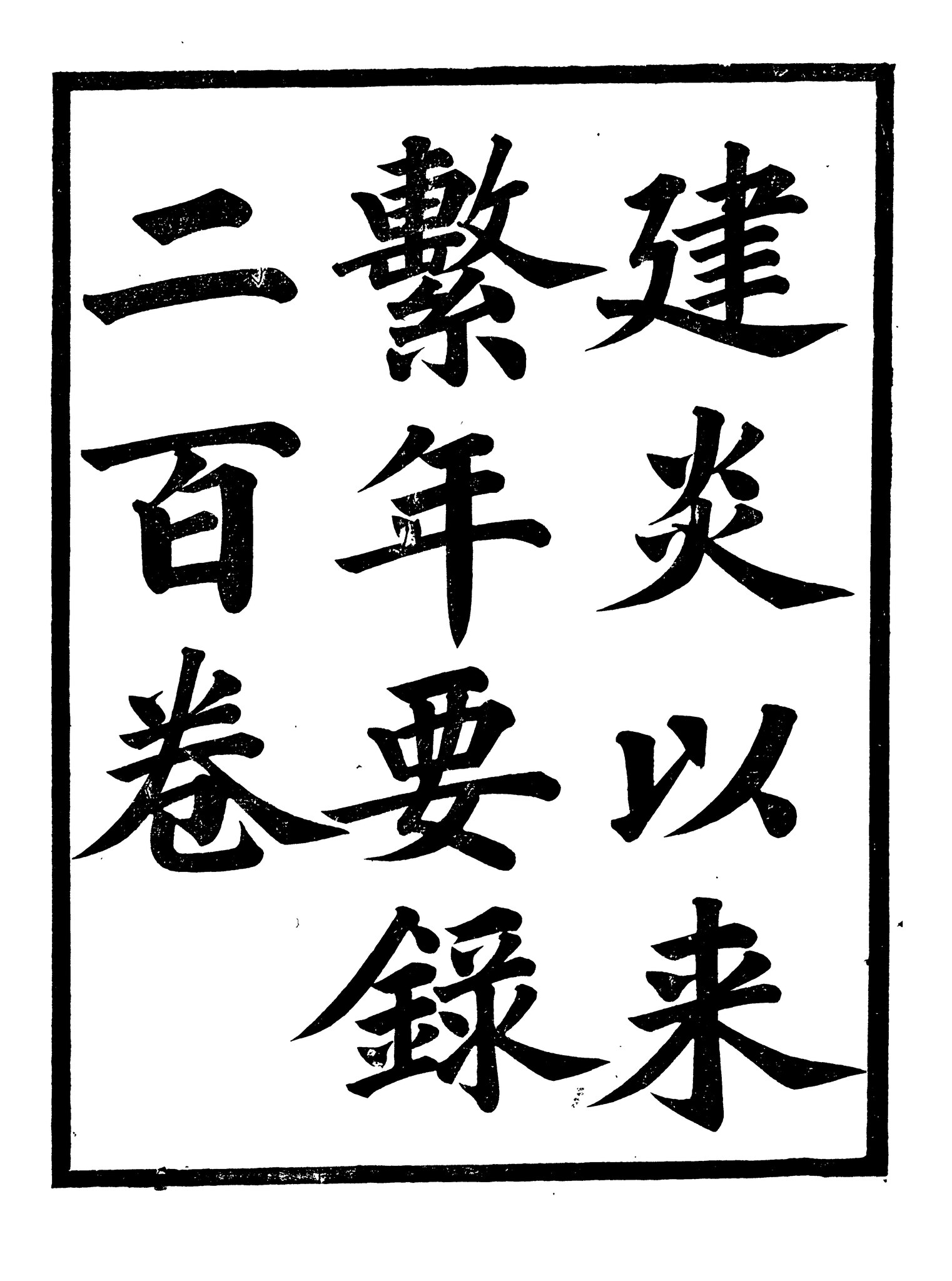
Title card of a 1900 printing of the Chronological Record

Li's most famous work is the Jianyan yilai xinian yaolu (建炎以來繫年要錄; 'Chronological Record of Important Events since 1127', also referred to as the Chronological Record), a chronological annals of the Song dynasty from its flight south in 1127 to the abdication of Emperor Gaozong in 1162. This book is one of the most widely-referenced primary sources for the Southern Song by historians, described by historian John C. Chaffee as a "detailed and authoritative history". The book may have initially covered up to the year 1194. According to the Song bibliographer Chen Zhensun, Li was forced to leave behind his drafts for the later portions by the Mongol invasion of Sichuan.

The primary source for much of the work was the Gaozong rili (高宗日歷; 'Gaozong Daily Calendar'), as well as to a lesser extant the Song huiyao (宋會要; 'Song State Compendium'). Portions of the Gaozong rili were altered and censored in the early 1140s by Qin Xi to support the regime of his father Qin Hui. As such, Li was forced to consult with various other sources to supplement the Gaozong rili for the affected years of 1143 to 1155. These supplementary sources include various Veritable Records as well as private accounts such as the scholar Xiong Ke's Zhongxing xiaoji (中興小紀; 'Minor Calendar of the Restoration') and the diary of Zhu Shengfei. Li decried Xiong's work as "evasive", but frequently cited it throughout the Chronological Record, often with the correction of Xiong's errors.

An initial draft of the Chronological Record was compiled in 1205, but faced heavy revisions over the following years. Following the death of Han Tuozhou in 1207, Li was able to levy harsher criticism against Qin Hui, which would have previously been seen as a veiled attack against Han's similarly autocratic leadership. Li's revisions significantly impacted future historical perspectives on Qin's leadership. The first full edition was delivered to the capital in 1212. Upon reading the work, the poet Lou Yue wrote that "now I understand that the requitals from Heaven make no error", referencing a line from the Han dynasty Sima Qian's history, Shiji.

Through its transmission to the Yuan, Ming, and Qing, the Chronological Record acquired multiple layers of commentary in addition to Li's own. It was relatively unknown throughout this period, although it was included in the 15th-century Yongle Encyclopedia and the 18th-century Siku quanshu. Its first printing after the fall of the Song was made in 1882.

=== Diverse Notes ===
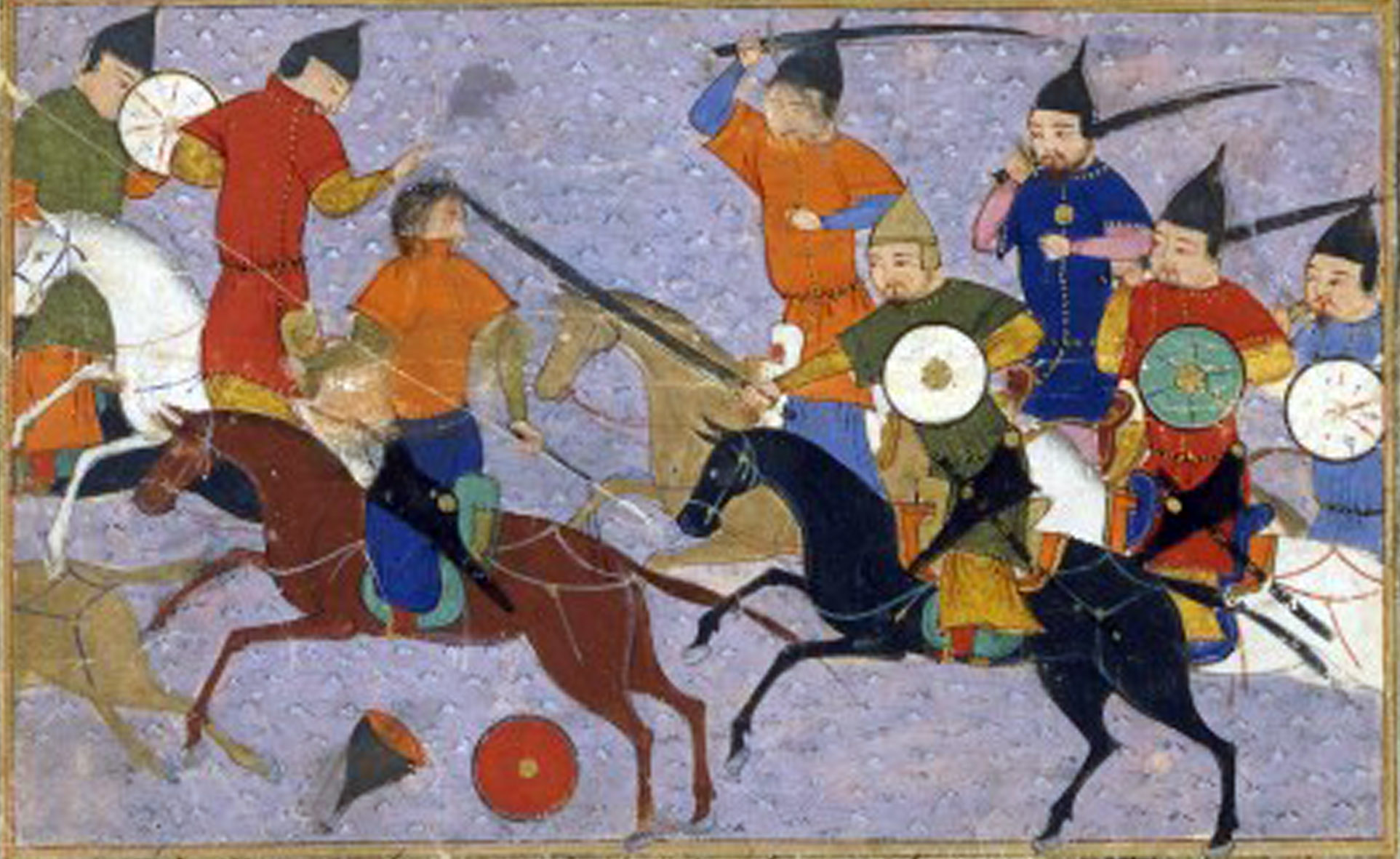
Li's account of the Mongol conquest of the Jin dynasty (15th century depiction pictured) is the earliest known description of the Mongol conquests.

The Chronological Record is supplemented by a topical index and guide entitled Jianyan yilai chaoye zaji (建炎以來朝野雜記; 'Diverse Notes on Court and Province since 1127', also referred to as the Diverse Notes), which was published in two installments (the first in 1202, the second in 1216). Unlike the surviving portions of the Chronological Record, the Diverse Notes include discussions of the reigns of Gaozong's successors, Xiaozong and Guangzong. Li organized the work into 13 topical sections: the Imperial House, sacrifices, state rituals, cultural works, policy initiatives, specific incidents, miscellaneous events, precedent-setting events, bureaucracy, the examination system, finance, the military, and border defense. According to the 13th-century scholar Zhang Duanyi, Li made two additional sections of the Diverse Notes, but these do not survive today.

The Diverse Notes include the earliest description of the Mongol conquests in any language, written around 1214–1215. This account was likely sourced from intelligence gathered by Song envoys to the Jin court. Li theorized that the Mongols were related to the Jurchen and had migrated into the Mongolian steppe from the Amur River basin, connecting them with a polity called Monggus which existed in the area during the 11th and 12th centuries. Declaring that the Mongols were "only motivated by greed and in the beginning had no far-reaching plans", Li described Genghis Khan as an honest and just ruler, while vilifying his general Samuqa (who had been left in charge of the Mongol campaign in Northern China when Genghis Khan returned to Mongolia). Li's account did not portray the Mongols as a significant threat to the Song, or describe their conquests in northern China as a major catastrophe.

Li collected a great deal of financial statistics for his work. The four chapters on finance included in the 1202 installment outline the methods by which the Southern Song collected revenue in great deal, describing systems such as the various state monopolies, forced labor exemption fees, and land taxes, as well as the agencies which managed the Song finances. Li felt that much of this revenue was squandered by corrupt officials, and notes various instances of corruption and unnecessary extravagance, such as the payment of 1.2 million strings of cash for the construction of a mausoleum in 1300.

=== Other works ===
While employed by the Song court in Lin'an, he collaborated on an official history entitled Zhongxing sichao guoshi (中興四朝國史; 'Four Restoration Courts State History'). Another of his surviving works is the 1239 Daominglu (道命錄; 'Records of the Mandate of the Way'), a short history of the Neo-Confucian movement from 1084 to 1224. The surviving edition is a dramatically expanded version produced by the scholar Cheng Rongxiu (程榮秀) in 1333, and was rewritten to center Cheng's ancestor Cheng Yi. However, the first half of Li's original survives through a portion of the Yongle Encyclopedia.

Li's lost works include his first book, Dushi kao, as well as his 1221 Xichui taiding lu (西陲泰定錄; 'An Account of the Western Frontier from 1201 through 1221'), which gave a chronology of contemporary events in Sichuan during the period, including the 1205–1207 Jin–Song war and Wu Xi's defection to the Jin. In 1219, alongside Zhu Xi's student Huang Gan (考鮮), he produced an edited volume of Zhu's sayings entitled Zhuzi yulu (朱子語錄; 'Records of Master Chu's Conversations') and edited his commentary on the I Ching, Zhouyi benyi (周易本義; 'The Original Meaning of the Book of Changes'). In 1223, Li published a collection of miscellaneous notes on Song history entitled Jiuwen zhengwu (舊聞證誤; 'Errors in Old Accounts'), which partially survives.

== Historiography and legacy ==
Li was unusual among his peers for expressing a relative disinterest in art, philosophy, or most government service. He was not fond of the study of past dynasties, preferring to focus solely on the Southern Song. Although many of his contemporaries shared his interest in recent history, Chaffee writes that none except Li Tao could compare to him "in singularity of purpose or magnitude of accomplishment".

While Li's work impacted future evaluations of Neo-Confucian history (such as his portrayal of the scholar Xing Shu as a traitor against his teacher, Cheng Yi), it is unknown if he was a Neo-Confucian scholar himself. Although he held political sympathies for them, his essays often lack the philosophical ideas associated with the movement, such as an emphasis on sagehood or the search for the overriding principles of history and the universe.

Dedicated to Confucian ideals, Li frequently attacked Buddhism, criticizing their temples for their large landholdings, which he saw as harmful to the common people. When a monk persuaded him to write an essay for a Huzhou Buddhist temple in 1234, he used the opportunity to denounce the religion, writing "the country establishes schools in the prefectures and counties in order to clarify human relationships; this is the proper business of Confucians. In establishing schools, is there any reason not to oppose the flourishing of monks?"

Li's work was admired by many of his contemporaries; Chaffee notes that he was "one of those rare historians whose works were widely read and influential in his own day." The 14th-century History of Song was less favorable towards him, describing him as talented but over-emphasizing Sichuan in his coverage.

== Notes ==
=== Works cited ===
- Atwood, Christopher P., ed. (2021). The Rise of the Mongols: Five Chinese Sources. Hackett Publishing Company. ISBN 9781647920029.
- Chaffee, John W. (1993). "The Historian as Critic: Li Hsin-ch'uan and the Dilemmas of Statecraft in Southern Sung China". In Hymes, Robert P.; Schirokauer, Conrad (eds.). Ordering the World: Approaches to State and Society in Sung Dynasty China. University of California Press. ISBN 9780520076914.
- Chaffee, John W. (1994). "Sung Biographies Supplementary Biography No. 2". Journal of Song-Yuan Studies (24): 205–215. JSTOR 23496126.
- Cheung, Hiu Yu (2023). "The 'Black Sheep' of the Early Daoxue Community: The Making of Xing Shu's Historical Image". Bulletin of the School of Oriental & African Studies. 86 (2): 317–334. doi:10.1017/S0041977X23000502.
- Hartman, Charles (2001). "Li Hsin-ch'uan and the Historical Image of Late Sung Tao-hsüeh". Harvard Journal of Asiatic Studies. 61 (2): 317–358. doi:10.2307/3558571. JSTOR 3558571.
- Hartman, Charles (2020). The Making of Song Dynasty History: Sources and Narratives, 960–1279 CE. Cambridge University Press. doi:10.1017/9781108877176. ISBN 9781108877176.
- Lai, Kehong (1990). 李心传事迹著作编年 [A Chronological Compilation of Li Xinchuan's Deeds and Writings] (in Chinese). Bashu Press. ISBN 9787805233390.
- Li, Cho-ying; Hartman, Charles (2011). "Primary Sources for Song History in the Collected Works of Wu Ne". Journal of Song-Yuan Studies (41): 295–341. JSTOR 23496213.

=== Further reading ===
- Hartman, Charles (1998). "The Making of a Villain: Ch'in Kuei and Tao-hsüeh". Harvard Journal of Asiatic Studies. 58 (1): 59–146. doi:10.2307/2652647. JSTOR 2652647.
- Hartman, Charles (2000). "Bibliographic Notes on Sung Historical Works: The Original Record of the Way and Its Destiny (Tao-ming lu) by Li Hsin-ch'uan". Journal of Song-Yuan Studies (30): 1–61. JSTOR 23495822.
