= 1194 =

1194 in various calendars
- Gregorian calendar: 1194; MCXCIV
- Ab urbe condita: 1947
- Armenian calendar: 643; ԹՎ ՈԽԳ
- Assyrian calendar: 5944
- Balinese saka calendar: 1115–1116
- Bengali calendar: 600–601
- Berber calendar: 2144
- English Regnal year: 5 Ric. 1 – 6 Ric. 1
- Buddhist calendar: 1738
- Burmese calendar: 556
- Byzantine calendar: 6702–6703
- Chinese calendar: 癸丑年 (Water Ox); 3891 or 3684 — to — 甲寅年 (Wood Tiger); 3892 or 3685
- Coptic calendar: 910–911
- Discordian calendar: 2360
- Ethiopian calendar: 1186–1187
- Hebrew calendar: 4954–4955
- Hindu calendars
- Vikram Samvat: 1250–1251
- Shaka Samvat: 1115–1116
- Kali Yuga: 4294–4295
- Holocene calendar: 11194
- Igbo calendar: 194–195
- Iranian calendar: 572–573
- Islamic calendar: 590–591
- Japanese calendar: Kenkyū 5 (建久５年)
- Javanese calendar: 1101–1102
- Julian calendar: 1194; MCXCIV
- Korean calendar: 3527
- Minguo calendar: 718 before ROC 民前718年
- Nanakshahi calendar: −274
- Seleucid era: 1505/1506 AG
- Thai solar calendar: 1736–1737
- Tibetan calendar: ཆུ་མོ་གླང་ལོ་ (female Water-Ox); 1320 or 939 or 167 — to — ཤིང་ཕོ་སྟག་ལོ་ (male Wood-Tiger); 1321 or 940 or 168

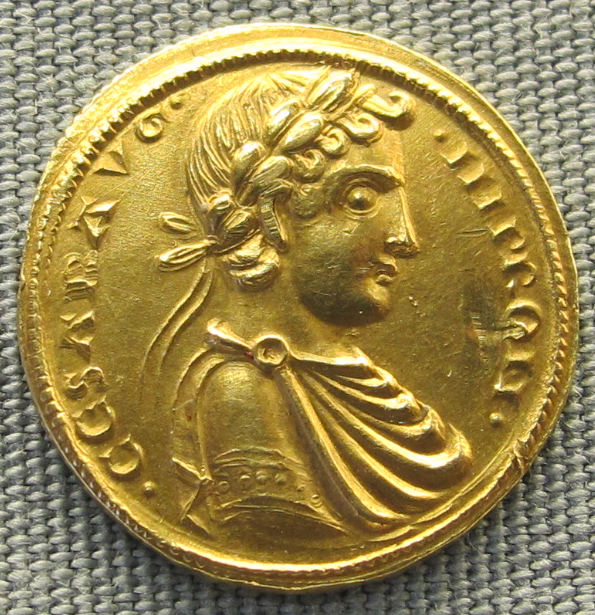
A coin of Frederick II (1194–1250)

Year 1194 (MCXCIV) was a common year starting on Saturday of the Julian calendar.

== Events ==
=== By place ===
==== England ====
- February 4 – King Richard I of England ("the Lionheart") is ransomed for an amount of 150,000 marks (demanded by Emperor Henry VI), raised by his mother Eleanor of Aquitaine – who travels to Austria to gain his release. Henry will never receive the full amount he demanded.
- March – Richard returns to England, and remains for only a few weeks before returning to the Continent. He leaves the administration of England in the hands of Hubert Walter, archbishop of Canterbury, who accompanied Richard on the Third Crusade and led his army back to England. He levied the taxes to pay the king's ransom and put down a plot against Richard by his younger brother John.
- March 12–28 – Richard I besieges Nottingham Castle (occupied by supporters of John) – which falls after a siege of several days. Richard is aided by English troops under Ranulf de Blondeville and David of Scotland.
- April 17 – Richard I is crowned for the second time, at Winchester, to underline his rightful position as monarch. During the coronation, he wears a golden crown and is followed by notables from the Church and State.
- May – Richard I calls for a council in Nottingham to raise funds for an expedition to France. On May 12, he leaves for Normandy with a large fleet (some 300 ships), to reclaim lands lost to King Philip II of France ("Augustus").
- Ordinance of the Jewry: Beginning of strict records of financial transactions by Jews liable to taxation. The Exchequer of the Jews at Westminster regulates the taxes and the law-cases (also in Wales).

==== Europe ====
- Spring – Casimir II the Just, High Duke of Poland, organizes an expedition against the Baltic Yotvingians. The expedition ends with full success, and Casimir has a triumphant return in Kraków. On May 5, after a banquet, which is held to celebrate his return, Casimir dies unexpectedly (possibly poisoned). He is succeeded by his eldest surviving son Leszek the White, who has to face strong opposition from his uncle Mieszko III the Old.
- July 3 – Battle of Fréteval: English forces under Richard I defeat Philip II, and capture the French baggage train. It contains the royal archives – including a list of the treasure of the French kingdom (transported in a wagon behind the army). Philip withdraws across the River Epte, where the bridge collapses under the weight of the retreating army. Meanwhile, Richard sacks the town of Évreux, which is a possession of Philip's ally, John.
- November 20 – Emperor Henry VI enforces the inheritance claims by his wife, Constance I, against her illegitimate nephew, King Tancred of Lecce (who died on February 20). He takes Palermo (supported by the navy of Pisa and Genoa) and gains control of all of Sicily – ending Norman rule in Italy after 90 years.
- December 25 – Henry VI deposes the 8-year-old William III (son of Tancred de Lecce) and is crowned king of Sicily. The next day, Constance I, who stays in the town of Iesi, gives birth to Frederick II, the future emperor of the Holy Roman Empire.

==== Levant ====
- October – Leo I ("Lord of the Mountains"), ruler of Armenian Cilicia, invites Bohemond III of Antioch to Bagras, ostensibly to resolve their differences. Upon Bohemond's arrival, Leon captures him and his family, and takes them to the capital of Sis.

==== Seljuk Empire ====
- March 10 – Sultan Toghrul III is defeated and killed in battle with Ala ad-Din Tekish, near Rey in Persia – ending the Seljuq dynasty of Hamedan. The Seljuk Empire passes to the Khwarazmian dynasty.

==== China ====
- July 24 – Emperor Guangzong of Song (or Zhao Dun) is forced to abdicate the throne to his 25-year-old son Ningzong, who succeeds him as ruler of the Song dynasty. During his reign, he will be dominated by his prime-minister Han Tuozhou (or Han T'o-Chou).
- The Yellow River experiences a major course change, taking over the Huai River drainage system for the next 700 years.

==== Mesoamerica ====
- Hunac Ceel drives the Itza people out of Chichen Itza, forcing them to start the Itza Kingdom on Lake Petén Itzá (modern Guatemala).

=== By topic ===
==== Commerce ====
- May 2 – Richard I grants Portsmouth market-town status with a royal charter. He orders the construction of docks on The Solent – having seen that the harbour is a perfect base for trade and the English fleet.

==== Economy and society ====
- Hubert Walter, vice-regent in the absence of Richard I, institutes the office of coroner to keep records of crown pleas. He also presides over the feudal judgment of John and makes an inquiry into land tenure.

==== Religion ====
- May 15 – Michael the Syrian reconsecrates the Mor Bar Sauma Monastery, which he reconstructed after its destruction by a fire. The monastery stays a center of the Syriac Orthodox Church until the end of the thirteenth century.
- July 10 – A fire devastates Chartres Cathedral. Only the crypt, the towers, and the new facade survives. Funds are collected from nobles, as well as small donations from ordinary people, to start the rebuilding.
- The Carthusian monastery of Scala Dei is founded in the region of Montsant in Catalonia.

== Births ==
- April 25 – Ezzelino III, Italian nobleman and knight (d. 1259)
- July 16 – Clare of Assisi, Italian nun and saint (d. 1253)
- November 30 – Andrea Caccioli, Italian priest (d. 1254)
- December 26 – Frederick II, Holy Roman Emperor (d. 1250)
- Jacob Anatoli, French Jewish translator and writer (d. 1256)
- Jacopo Contarini, doge of Venice (House of Contarini) (d. 1280)
- Lý Huệ Tông, Vietnamese emperor (Lý dynasty) (d. 1226)
- Majd al-Din Taymiyyah, Seljuk judge and theologian (d. 1255)
- Margaret, marchioness of Namur (House of Vianden) (d. 1270)
- Maurice FitzGerald, Norman nobleman and justiciar (d. 1257)
- Moses ben Nahman, Spanish rabbi and philosopher (d. 1270)
- Otto I, Dutch nobleman and bishop (House of Gelre) (d. 1215)
- Richard Mór de Burgh, Norman nobleman (approximate date)
- Rusudan, queen of Georgia (House of Bagrationi) (d. 1245)
- Saionji Saneuji, Japanese nobleman and waka poet (d. 1269)

== Deaths ==
- February 20 – Tancred of Lecce, king of Sicily (b. 1138)
- March 19 – Toghrul III, sultan of the Seljuk Empire
- April 3
  - Bård Guttormsson, Norwegian nobleman
  - Sigurd Magnusson, Norwegian nobleman
- April 20 – Odon of Poznań, duke of Greater Poland
- May 5 – Casimir II the Just, duke of Lesser Poland
- June 27 – Sancho VI ("the Wise"), king of Navarre (b. 1132)
- June 28 – Xiao Zong, Chinese emperor (Song dynasty) (b. 1127)
- July 18 – Guy of Lusignan, king of Jerusalem (b. 1150)
- July 27 – Sviatoslav III, Kievan Grand Prince (b. 1126)
- November 15 – Margaret I, countess of Flanders
- December 26 – Aubrey de Vere, 1st Earl of Oxford
- December 31 – Leopold V, duke of Austria (b. 1157)
- Basil Vatatzes, Byzantine governor and general
