= Empress Yang (Song dynasty) =

Empress Gongsheng 恭聖仁烈皇后

Empress consort of the Southern Song dynasty
- Tenure: 29 December 1202 – 17 September 1224 (22 years)
- Predecessor: Empress Gongshu
- Successor: Empress Xie Daoqing

Empress dowager and regent of the Southern Song dynasty
- Regency: 17 September 1224 – 18 January 1233 (8 years)
- Born: 30 June 1162; Kuaiji, Zhejiang, China
- Died: 18 January 1233 (aged 71); Ciming Palace; Lin'an, Zhejiang, China
- Burial: Yongmaoling (永茂陵) mausoleum Shaoxing, Zhejiang
- Spouse: Emperor Ningzong
- Issue: Zhao Zeng (biological); Zhao Jiong (biological); Zhao Xun (adopted); Zhao Hong (adopted); Zhao Yun (adopted)
Posthumous name
- Empress Gongsheng Renlie (恭聖仁烈皇后)
- Father: Unknown
- Mother: Zhang Shansheng

Empress Yang (30 June 1162 – 18 January 1233), formally titled Empress Gongsheng and also known as Yang Meizi, was a Chinese empress consort whose political acumen enabled her to serve as de facto empress regnant for years. She is considered "one of the most powerful empresses of the Song dynasty and...[possibly] the Southern Song dynasty's most powerful Empress."

Yang is generally described as intelligent, ruthless and, at times, malicious, while outwardly maintaining a saintly and liberal image. She was the second Song empress after Empress Dowager Liu to come from a humble background and, like Liu, was an astute wielder of power both at court and in the palace. Her later claim to be from a distinguished military family is believed by modern historians to be a fabrication for political reasons.

Recent historiography uncovered a connection between Empress Yang and an artist named Yang Meizi, who were believed for centuries to have been two different people. This discovery has led to the reappraisal of previous narratives involving both names. Yang Meizi, hitherto dismissed as concerned chiefly with romance and beauty, was granted a dimension of leadership and political acumen. Empress Yang, already respected, gained an aspect of humanity which was formerly foreign to her image.

== Biography ==
It is said that she came from Kuaiji, reportedly the biological or adopted daughter of courtesan, Zhang Shansheng (d. 1170), who became an actress in the service of Empress Dowager Wu. Historical accounts suggest that Zhang Shansheng left the palace, but allegedly learned through a vision that her daughter would become a famous politician. Zhang Shansheng then returned to the palace as a court musician, rising through the ranks due to her musical abilities. It is recorded that one day, Empress Wu called for Madame Zhang only to learn that Madame Zhang had died. Yang Meizi, her daughter (also known as Yang Guizhi (杨桂枝)), was the natural substitute, and she was swiftly brought into the palace. From the age of ten Yang took her mother's place as entertainer, and became renowned for her skill at playing the pipa.

== As imperial concubine ==
In 1195, Yang married Zhao Kuo, the future Emperor Ningzong, and was named the Lady of Pingle Commandery (平乐郡夫人). She was promoted to the title jieyu (婕妤) in 1197 when her mentor and advocate, Grand Empress Dowager Wu, died at the age of 82. Needing a new way to shore up her position, Yang had the palace eunuchs find an official who was willing to be her accomplice in changing her family history, and with his cooperation, she claimed to be the sister of the official Yang Cishan, and assumed his surname. After this, she invited him to the palace for a "reunion feast" to celebrate the discovery of her long lost family, who would prove to be very helpful in her rise to power. In 1199, Yang was promoted to wanyi (婉仪), and, in 1200, to guifei (贵妃) the highest title a secondary wife could attain.

== As imperial noble consort ==
In 1200 Ningzong's official consort, Empress Han, died of an illness. Consort Cao (曹美人), described as gentle and submissive, and Yang, who had borne the Emperor two sons, were the front-runners to succeed her as Empress. Yang had other advantages as, following the death of Empress Wu, she had effectively run the harem and presided over most duties of the Inner Court. Han Tuozhou, an uncle of the deceased Empress Han, advised Ningzong against choosing Yang, seeing her ambition and talent as a potential threat. According to one story, Ningzong arranged a dinner for each consort to decide which one to elevate. Yang allowed Cao to have her dinner first. This meant that the emperor came to Yang's dinner at night, already somewhat drunk from his dinner with Cao. Yang convinced the drunk emperor to sign an edict making Cao empress at the table. This first edict was intercepted by Han Tuozhou, as she had expected. Believing he had won, he relaxed his guard, allowing Yang to outmaneuver him and convince Ningzong to sign another edict which named her as empress. Another version simply states that Ningzong simply preferred Yang's intelligence and knowledge over Cao's demureness, and thus Yang did not have to do much to convince him.

== As empress consort ==
Empress Yang quickly proved her worth as empress. Ningzong, a man who had been brought up as a pampered child, was the unfortunate victim of the Song Dynasty's recent family squabbles. Most notable among these were the conflict between his father, Emperor Guangzong and his grandfather, Emperor Xiaozong, as well as the related rivalry between his mother, Empress Li, and his great-grandmother, Empress Wu. As a result, he appears to have never emotionally recovered from these psychological wounds. Even if he was mature and possessed the qualities of a good ruler, he was a man of frail health and questionable mental faculties, which suited Yang's purposes.

Yang never forgave Han Tuozhou for trying to prevent her from becoming empress. She tried several times to turn the emperor against him, first by appointing members of the Wu Clan to power. The intent was to rival the growing influence of the Han Clan under Tuozhou's leadership. In addition Yang had her adopted brother, Yang Cishan, promoted to a high military position, which increased her political power even more.

Following the Jin-Song war of 1205–07, which ended in a stalemate, Yang was able to increase her support while Han Touzhou, whose militaristic policies had caused the conflict for no real return, had become unpopular with the court at large. The discontent allowed Yang to sow the seeds that would allow her to orchestrate his downfall, as the Emperor grew less confident in him. Finally, with her smear campaign successful, Empress Yang ordered Yang Cishun and her ally, Shi Miyuan, to murder Han on his way to the Palace for the Daily Assembly. He was intercepted at the Sixth Platoon Bridge by the Imperial Guard Commander Xie, dragged into the Yuchin garden right outside the Imperial City, and bludgeoned to death by a mob of infuriated elite Palace guards. While Ningzong discovered the plot, Yang had pleaded with him to stay out of it, and he agreed not to interfere once she threatened to commit suicide.

For carrying out his task, Shi Miyuan was rewarded with promotion to Minister of Rites. In 1208, he became Grand Chancellor, a position through which he came to dominate the Imperial Court. He placed numerous spies within the Palace, including in the harem of the designated crown prince, ensuring that nothing happened in the palace without him knowing. For her own part, Empress Yang was capable of mimicking Ningzong's handwriting, and she sometimes used this talent for "ghostwriting" to achieve her ends. Notably, it is highly possible that she wrote the imperial "consents" for Han Tuozhou to be expelled and assassinated. Ghostwriting was used extensively by rulers in and around the Song dynasty as a way of delegating imperial responsibility, but was sometimes cast in a bad light because many ghostwriters were of low class status.

== Consolidation of power ==
Although Empress Yang enjoyed political favour, she made a point of acting with self restraint on a number of occasions, seemingly to avoid negative comparisons with previous Song Empress Liu E, as well as Wu Zetian of the Tang Dynasty. Nonetheless, a balance of power existed at the Imperial Court between the bureaucracy and the Inner Palace, and a relationship which was mutually beneficial ensued.

Yang's foster son and crown prince designate, Zhao Kai, loved and respected her as though she were his mother, leading her to support his claims and grant him political counsel. Furthermore, Emperor Ningzong grew to trust her enough to make her his secret chief advisor, a post in which she revised his petitions and suggested appointments and dismissals of officials in the Court. Her powers reached their height when she had the Imperial Seal, previously misused by Han Touzhou, returned to the palace and specifically to her care.

For fifteen years she experienced little opposition, as Shi Miyuan controlled the Grand Chancellory. However in 1220 the new crown prince, Zhao Hong, began to argue against her involvement in political affairs. Shi, also threatened by Hong, then found a new candidate in Zhao Yuju, who would be proclaimed as Emperor Lizong on Ningzong's death. Yang was apparently reluctant to do this, although if accounts are to be believed Shi persuaded her, allegedly by threatening to massacre her adopted family. Zhao Hong was deposed and forced to accept the situation, after which he was exiled to the country.

== As empress dowager and regent ==
In gratitude for giving him the throne, Emperor Lizong invited Yang to reign as his co-regent behind a lowered silk and pearl screen. She accepted the offer and ruled jointly with him until her death in 1233, eight years later. To the opposition of many at court, she selected Empress Xie Daoqing rather than the emperor's favorite Consort Jia (died 1247) as empress.

In assuming the co-regency with Lizong, Yang became the true wielder of power at the Imperial Court, able to issue just about any decree she wanted when she wanted. She also became the arbitrator of bureaucratic disputes and granted special names to her birthday celebrations. In 1226, Yang was named Empress Dowager Shouming. In 1228, she was additionally named Empress Dowager Shoumingcirui (寿明慈睿皇太后). In 1231, she was named Empress Dowager Shoumingrenfucirui (寿明仁福慈睿皇太后)

She proved not so different from her predecessors when she sent envoys to the Jurchens in her own name, as well as having open meetings with the Courtiers, especially Shi Miyuan. It was rumoured, but never proven, that they were lovers based on this closeness. She went the extra step of styling herself Her Imperial Majesty, and the Officials referred to her as "Bixia", a title reserved solely for Emperors. As Emperor Lizong allowed himself to be politically dominated by his foster mother, her actions ultimately made her appear no less than an Emperor herself.

It was during Emperor Lizong's regime that she further cemented her political footing. Having been deprived of the throne, Zhao Hong yielded to pressure from his supporters and raised a revolt to return to the capital and take the throne by force. The coup d'état, which was planned to be a quick victory, was defeated within two weeks, after which Yang declared Hong a rebel and traitor. He was tried by a State Tribunal and, while the Emperor was unwilling to kill Hong, the verdict was death. Yang issued an edict ordering Hong to commit suicide by strangulation.

Despite all this, her outwardly kind nature made her a popular figure among the people, who idolized her as the living embodiment of the Goddess of Mercy, Guanyin. In addition, Yang was a staunch patron of the Arts and Buddhism. She spent much of her personal wealth renovating and expanding temple complexes, funding the academies, as well as retraining and re-equipping the largely inefficient Southern Song army.

On a number of occasions Yang carried out religious ceremonies in public, which accorded her a celestial aura. For example, as Empress Dowager, she carried out the Sericultural Ceremony to the goddess of silkworms, despite the ceremony being reserved for Empress Consorts. The worship at the Ancestral Temple, which had become another popular trend for powerful Empress Dowagers, was supposed to be done by the Emperor alone. Yang was the third and last woman to perform these rites after Empresses Liu E and Wu.

In the last decade of her life, following her 30-year de facto reign over the Empire, the once weak and vulnerable state with an ineffective military force had become a strong, formidable power, as she reduced the influence of the merchant clans and political factions in the Court, and restored power to the throne that had been lost following the reign of Emperor Guangzong and his wife, Empress Li.

She aided farmers by renting out the idle fertile lands of the Imperial family to the commoners, fostered International trade relations with Goryeo, Japan, India, and Tibet, and developed roads and trading centres which economically strengthened the Empire. Finally, she eventually rid the Southern Song Court of corrupt officials, which assured its survival for the immediate future, as well as concluding an alliance with the Mongols to safeguard the State from foreign threats.

She continued to expand the number of applicants from humble families for the Imperial Examinations to increase the pool of officials. However, she had built a system only she could sustain.

== Death ==
In 1233, she died in the Ciming Palace, and was posthumously named Gongshengrenlie (恭圣仁烈).

After her death the influence of the Yang, Shi, Ma and Wu Clans, on which she had greatly relied for her own political survival, considerably diminished. Shi Miyuan, though still Grand Chancellor, was psychologically and emotionally troubled by her death, which only increased the speculation that the two had been lovers. Historically it is asserted that Shi Miyuan never recovered from the depression and grief, and his grip over State Affairs loosened as his health declined. He would die ten months later, to be succeeded by Deng Daqian.

The rapid decline of the Song Dynasty after her death has been explained by the argument that she had left behind a poor and weak choice of an Empress as her successor, and Emperor Lizong did little to improve the condition of his people as he lacked her foresight and advice, and was uninterested in handling the affairs of State.

By the time of her death in 1233, the Empress Dowager Yang had been the eighth of nine powerful Song Empresses, following Liu, Cao, Gao, Xiang, Meng, Wu, Li. Events soon turned in favour of another, Empress Xie, Empress Yang's own daughter-in-law and chosen successor. Unbeknownst to many, Empress Xie was destined to be the last significant empress of the Song Dynasty.

== Empress Yang and the arts ==
=== Poetry ===
Empress Yang is one of the most prominent Song-dynasty poets who wrote in the genre of Shengping (升平). Shengping poetry, a style created by Emperor Taizong when he was admiring spring blossoms with members of his court, focused primarily on the celebration of court life and the prospect of a peaceful and prosperous world under imperial rule. Around fifty surviving poems of Empress Yang were collected by Mao Jin in the Ming dynasty and included in the Er Jia Gong Ci (三二家宫詞), alongside those of Emperor Huizong. Empress Yang was one of the only four female poets of the Song Dynasty whose works have survived, which makes her works even more valuable. Formatted mainly in the style of Qi Jue (七绝), Yang's Gong Ci poems depict the rich beauty of the imperial court, focusing on the elaborate lives of court figures as well as courtesans and ministers of the inner court, and celebrate the peace and stability of the Southern Song Dynasty perceived from the standpoint of Empress. Similar to her poetic inscriptions, Empress Yang also regularly utilized the metaphor of flowers or other natural subjects as a metaphor for celebrating people or general characteristics of the royal family. For example, in the thirteenth entry of her Gong Ci, the description of lotus flowers in bloom is in fact an allegory for the lively peace of imperial court:

"The curtains of the water hall are hooked to the wind, the rich blossoms of the lotus flowers have reddened people's reflections. My Emperor has finished his song on the flowery strings, and all earthly annoyance have trickled away."

Utilizing the imagery of a naturalistic water hall and blooming lotus, the first two lines of the poem highlight the beauty of the Imperial garden, signifying the free-flowing and vibrant spirit of the royal family. The subsequent two lines then demonstrate the artistic talent of the emperor for being able to transcend "all the vulgarities" with his instrument, implying the main theme of celebrating the harmony of the court and the pursuit of literary elegance.

=== Painting ===
Some scholars believe that Holding Wine Cups under the Moon (Tianjin Museum) and Cherry Blossoms and Oriole (Shanghai Museum) are painted by Empress Yang. It is also widely believed that the Hundred Flowers Scroll, which may be the oldest surviving painting by a female artist in Chinese art history, should be attributed to Empress Yang. However, there are many controversies surrounding this issue.

==== Artistic commissions ====
Empress Yang is best known for her collaborations with the Song court painter Ma Yuan. Yang was a gifted calligrapher, and her poems often graced Ma Yuan's works in a sort of accompaniment or explanation. It can be argued that recent art history values the poems more than the paintings, as they are indicative of the opinions and views of the nobility. Empress Yang's increasing popularity has also made some of her work far more valuable.

Stylistically, Ma Yuan favored the infusion of nature with humans and man-made structures. As was indicative of his time, the landscape is not merely a background, but a subject - a living, dynamic, active player in the work. Depictions of royal architecture are central to his style, partly due to trends in art during his time, but also due to his occupation as a court painter. Specifically for his work with Empress Yang, light imagery and illustrations of the graceful facets of natural Chinese landscapes - blossoms, bamboo, and mountains - are among the most commonly-featured images.

A typical example of such a collaboration is Ma Yuan's Night Banquet, currently housed in Taipei's National Palace Museum. It depicts the title event in the characteristic details of Emperor Ningzong's administration while staying true to the painter's style and the demands of Song artistic culture. In the background, large mountains rise above the horizon, while fog and low clouds occupy the vertical center. Far below a palace is pictured, with several ministers and court patrons exchanging pleasantries. The arrangement of the features in the work give room above the palace for Empress Yang's calligraphy, which emphasizes the feelings of a warm, damp summer night in Hangzhou, the capital of the Song dynasty. Further connecting the poem and the painting are the former's details about the Han Hall, presumably the palace pictured, and descriptions of a banquet.

Night Banquet is a prime example of the themes explored in Empress Yang's poetry, as she re-imagined literary culture to represent the values common in Confucian women while fundamentally challenging assumptions of gender held by many in her time. For example, her encouragement of such frivolities involving alcohol as those depicted in Night Banquet could be seen as unbecoming of a Confucian woman, but she was also politically inclined to support the customs of the nobility. Her embrace of noble culture and the reclamation of that culture for women has made her a famous figure in contemporary studies of how gender roles were challenged in older East Asian societies.

Empress Yang is also the author of several important inscriptions in the paintings of Xia Gui, the other great landscape painter of the Southern Song Dynasty, such as Twelve Views of Landscape. Based on her achievement in poetic inscription, art historian John Hay commented that "before [Empress Yang's] time no scroll or fan was ever viewed as such an intimate union of word and image."

==== Inscriptions (attributed) ====
Ma Yuan, Attending the Banquet by Lantern Light, with poetic inscription attributed to Emperor Ningzong. Early thirteenth century, Southern Song period. Hanging scroll, ink and color on silk, 111.9 x 535 cm. National Palace Museum, Taipei.

Ma Yuan, Apricot Blossoms. Twelfth century. Southern Song period. Album leaf, ink and color on silk, 25.2 x 25.3 cm. National Palace Museum, Taipei.

Ma Lin, Layer upon Layer of Icy Tips. Dated 1216, Southern Song period. Hanging scroll, ink and color on silk, 101.7 x 49.6 cm. Palace Museum, Beijing.

Ma Yuan, Peach Blossoms. Album leaf, 25.8 x 27.3 cm. National Palace Museum, Taipei.

Ma Yuan, Dong shan Wading through Water, with encomium by Empress Yang. Early thirteenth century. Southern Song period. Hanging scroll, ink and color on silk, 77.6x33cm. Tokyo National Museum.

Ma Yuan, Holding Wine Cups under the Moon. Late twelfth to early thirteenth century. Southern Song period. Album leaf, ink and color on silk, 25.3 x 27.5 cm. Tianjin Art Museum.

Ma Yuan, Twelve Scenes of Water. Dated 1222. Album leaves mounted as a handscroll. Ink and light color on silk, 26.8 x 41.6 cm, each. Palace Museum, Beijing.

Ma Yuan, Presenting Wine. Late twelfth to early thirteenth century. Southern Song period. Album leaf, ink and color on silk, 25.6 x 28.5 cm. Tang Shi Fan Collection.

Anonymous, Golden Blossoms of the Weeping Willow. Twelfth century. Southern Song period. Album leaf, ink and color on silk. 25.8 x 24.6 cm. Palace Museum, Beijing.

===== Layer Upon Layer on Icy Tips =====
This painting differs from most other paintings carrying an inscription by Empress Yang: it is attributed not to Ma Yuan, but to his son Ma Lin. It is a hanging scroll, a more public medium than the usual fan or album leaf; the dedicated recipient is not Emperor Ningzong, but rather the Supervisor in Chief Wang. It is originally one of a set of four hanging scrolls depicting different plum blossoms.

The painting features two branches covered with white blossoms of palace plum (gongmei). Empress Yang's poetic inscription utilized the poetic mode of yongwu, or the singing of objects, to foster a personal reading of the blossoms. She portrays the plum as a timeless beauty withstanding the winter cold, pure and lofty—the qualities that Empress Yang wished to associate herself with as a powerful empress.

The calligraphy style of this inscription is notably different from Empress Yang's calligraphy in an earlier painting, Apricot Blossoms. While the former can be characterized as smooth and bold, the latter seems more slender and restrained. It is supposed that in Layer, she was perhaps mimicking the calligraphy style of Yan Zhenqing, a renowned calligrapher of Tang Dynasty. The calligraphy of Layer borrowed the proportion of Yan's characters, as each stroke was distributed evenly. The details of the brushwork—such as the heavy and tapered vertical strokes, and the "swallowtail" notch at the end of the right-falling strokes—demonstrated her deep learning of the calligraphy style of the Tang Dynasty. The employment of this "masculine" style of writing perhaps also reflects Empress Yang's own political ambition in the Song court.

== Legacy ==
Empress Yang was an intelligent and strong-willed Empress Dowager, who reformed and strengthened the Southern Song Dynasty while safeguarding it from the Mongols and the Jurchens. Ultimately, she had a hand in the destruction of the Jurchen Empire that had long terrorized the Song Empire, and earned her place as the most politically adept empress of her time. As a testament to her status, her funeral was conducted no different from that of an Emperor. Even the Ming Dynasty scholars, while censuring her for her unfeminine conduct, concede that she was a very capable monarch. While the true extent of her power cannot be known due to incomplete records, it cannot be doubted that she is one of the most influential women in Chinese history.

It is held that, of the Song Dynasty's Nine Great Empresses, Empress Yang ranks alongside Empress Liu, Empress Gao, and Empress Wu as the most politically shrewd, capable, and broad-minded of the group.

== Titles ==
=== During the reign of Emperor Ningzong (1194–1224) ===
- Yang Cairen - 1194
- Lady of Pingle Commandery - 1195
- Jieyu - 1197
- Wanyi - 1199
- Guifei - 1200
- Empress Consort - 1202

=== During the reign of Emperor Lizong (1224–1233) ===
- Empress Dowager Yang - 1224–1226
- Empress Dowager Shouming - 1226–1228
- Empress Dowager Shoumingcirui - 1228–1231
- Empress Dowager Shoumingrenfucirui - 1231–1233

=== Posthumously ===
- Empress Gongshengrenlie - 1233

== Family ==
- Father: Unknown
- Mother: Zhang Shansheng
- Spouse: Emperor Ningzong
- Issue:
  - Zhao Zeng (biological)
  - Zhao Jiong (biological)
  - Zhao Xun (adopted)
  - Zhao Hong (adopted)
  - Zhao Yun (adopted)
- Brother: Yang Cishan
- Daughters-in-law:
  - Empress Shouhe of the Xie Clan
  - Guifei of the Jia Clan
  - Guifei of the Yan Clan
- Grandchildren:
  - Princess Zhouhan Duanxiao
  - Princess Zhenzhu
  - Emperor Duzong (adopted)
  - Zhao Ji, Prince Yongchong'an
  - Zhao Yi Prince Zhaochongchun

Chinese royalty
Preceded by Empress Gongshu	Empress of China; 1202–1224	Succeeded by Empress Xie Daoqing
