= Zhao Xun =

Zhao Xun may refer to:

- Zhao Xun (Song dynasty) (Chinese: 趙詢), Crown Prince of the Song dynasty
- Zhao Xun (theater theorist) (Chinese: 赵寻), former vice-president of China Theatre Association
