= Empress Wu (Song dynasty) =

Empress Xiansheng 憲聖慈烈皇后

Empress consort of the Southern Song dynasty
- Tenure: 18 May 1143 – 24 July 1162
- Predecessor: Empress Xianjie
- Successor: Empress Xia
- Tenure: 24 July 1162 – 9 November 1187

Empress dowager of the Southern Song dynasty
- Tenure: 9 November 1187 – 28 June 1194

Grand empress dowager of the Southern Song dynasty
- Tenure: 28 June 1194 – 12 December 1197
- Born: 11 September 1115; Bianjing, Henan, China
- Died: 12 December 1197 (aged 82); Lin'an, Zhejiang, China
- Burial: Yongsiling (永思陵); Shaoxing, Zhejiang
- Spouse: Emperor Gaozong
Posthumous name
- Empress Xiansheng Cilie (憲聖慈烈皇后)
- Father: Wu Jin

Empress Wu (11 September 1115 – 12 December 1197) was a Chinese empress consort of the Song dynasty, married to Emperor Gaozong of Song. She played an influential part in politics of the Southern Song dynasty for 35 years having caused the abdication of three subsequent monarchs: Emperor Gaozong in 1162, Emperor Xiaozong in 1189, and Emperor Guangzong in 1194.

== Life ==
Wu was the daughter of Wu Jin, a commoner in Kaifeng. At the age of fourteen, she was selected as a palace maid to Gaozong, then a Prince, and his first spouse and primary consort Xing, who had recently married.

== The Fall of Kaifeng ==
In 1126, Emperor Huizong abdicated in favor of his son, Emperor Qinzong, the elder brother of Gaozong. In 1127, the capital of Kaifeng was captured by the Jurchen during the Jin–Song Wars. The Emperor Qinzong was deposed, and him, as well as his predecessor Emperor Huizong and most of the Imperial family and court, over 3000 people, was captured and exiled to Manchuria in what was called the Jingkang Incident. They were first taken to the Jurchen capital, many of them dying on the way. The Imperial consorts, concubines, palace women and eunuchs who were taken captured, were distributed among the Jurchen as slaves. Consort Xing, the primary spouse of Gaozong, were among those captured and taken away: nothing more is known of her except that she was coveted by her captors, that she attempted suicide to escape abuse but failed, and that she died in captivity in 1139.

== Southern Song dynasty ==
Gaozong himself, as well as Wu, avoided capture because they were absent from the capital when it fell. Gaozong then organized the resistance against further Jurchen invasion, declaring himself Emperor in late 1127 and establishing the Southern Song dynasty. Knowing his primary consort Xing was still alive in captivity, he declared her to be Empress in absentia. Wu followed him on his military campaigns against Jin dressed in armor, and reportedly saved his life on one occasion when they were attacked by thugs, shooting one to death with an arrow, and frightening the rest away.

== As imperial consort ==
Having no surviving sons of his own, he adopted two boys in 1133: one of them became the foster son of Wu in 1140, and the other one (future Emperor Xiaozong) in 1142. Emperor Gaozong kept the position of Empress vacant because he did not know whether Consort Xing was still alive or not: when she died in 1139, the Jurchen kept her death a secret, and it was not until his mother, Consort Wei, was released and allowed to join him, that he learned that she was dead. Her remains were returned to be buried the same year. It was not until 1143 that Gaozong was persuaded by his mother and his ministers to appoint a new Empress, and he promoted Consort Wu to the position.

== As empress consort ==
Empress Wu was praised by both her husband and her foster son Emperor Xiaozong for tolerating the large number of concubines and consorts Gaozong took without complaints. In reality, however, she actually had a large number of them dismissed.

== As empress dowager ==
In 1162, Empress Wu persuaded Emperor Gaozong to abdicate in favor of Emperor Xiaozong. She then became Empress Dowager Wu and exercised virtual influence in State affairs.

During this time she even became particularly close with a Court entertainer Zhang Shansheng with whom a reliable friendship sprouted. However, following her death, she invited her daughter into her care in the Cifu Palace in 1170 and put her under the maternity watch of Yang Cairen who would raise her into the future Empress Yang.

== As grand empress dowager ==
In 1189, the Crown Prince asked her to persuade Emperor Xiaozong to abdicate in his favor, which she did. Upon the succession of Emperor Guangzong in 1189, it was actually suggested that she would act as his regent, because of his bad health. In reality, it was the Emperor's consort, Empress Li Fengniang, who ruled during the reign of Emperor Guangzong but nonetheless came into a vicious political conflict with her having estranged the relationship between the Retired Emperor Xiaozong and his son Emperor Guangzong. In 1194, Empress Dowager Wu was persuaded to force Emperor Guangzong to abdicate in favor of Emperor Ningzong of Song.

She withdrew from state affairs actively but retained a virtual role even as the Matriarch of the Imperial family until she died in 1197 in Cifu Palace at the age of 83 years having personally mentored and fostered Yang Meizi who would become Ningzong's second Empress Gongsheng five years later.

== Notes ==
Chinese royalty
Preceded by Empress Xing	Empress of China; 1143–1162	Succeeded by Empress Xia (Song dynasty)
