= Zhao Hong =

Zhao Hong is the name of:

- Zhao Hong (fl. 184), a minor leader of the Yellow Turban Rebellion
- Zhao Hong (Song dynasty) (1207–1225), adopted son and heir apparent of Emperor Ningzong
