= Empress Ciyi =

Empress Ciyi (Chinese: 慈懿皇后) may refer to:

- Li Fengniang (1144–1200), wife of Emperor Guangzong of Song
- Empress Qian (1426–1468), wife of the Zhengtong Emperor
