= Sanmao Zhenjun =

Three deities in Chinese Taoism

Qing dyansty painting of Sanmao Zhenjun.

Sanmao Zhenjun (Chinese: 三茅真君; pinyin: Sānmáo Zhēnjūn; lit. 'The Three Perfected Mao Lords'), also known as the Three Brothers of Mount Mao, are three gods in Taoism. They are Mao Ying (茅盈), Mao Gu (茅固), and Mao Zhong (茅衷). Daoist tradition describes them as brothers who became immortals during the Han dynasty. They are worshipped at Maoshan in Jiangsu, a centre of the Shangqing School of Taoism.

== Legends ==
The brothers were said to have come from Xianyang in present-day Shaanxi. Mao Ying, the eldest, left home at the age of eighteen to study Taoism on Mount Heng. He later met the Queen Mother of the West, who taught him the way to become immortal. His younger brothers, Mao Gu and Mao Zhong, became government officials. They later gave up their posts and went to study under Mao Ying. All three became immortals and settled on Juqu Mountain (句曲山), which was later called Maoshan after them.

The brothers' stories were not always the same. The early text Shangshu Diyanqi (尚書帝驗期) mentions Mao Ying meeting the Queen Mother of the West, but says nothing about his brothers. Their family history and other details were added in later writings.

== Worship ==
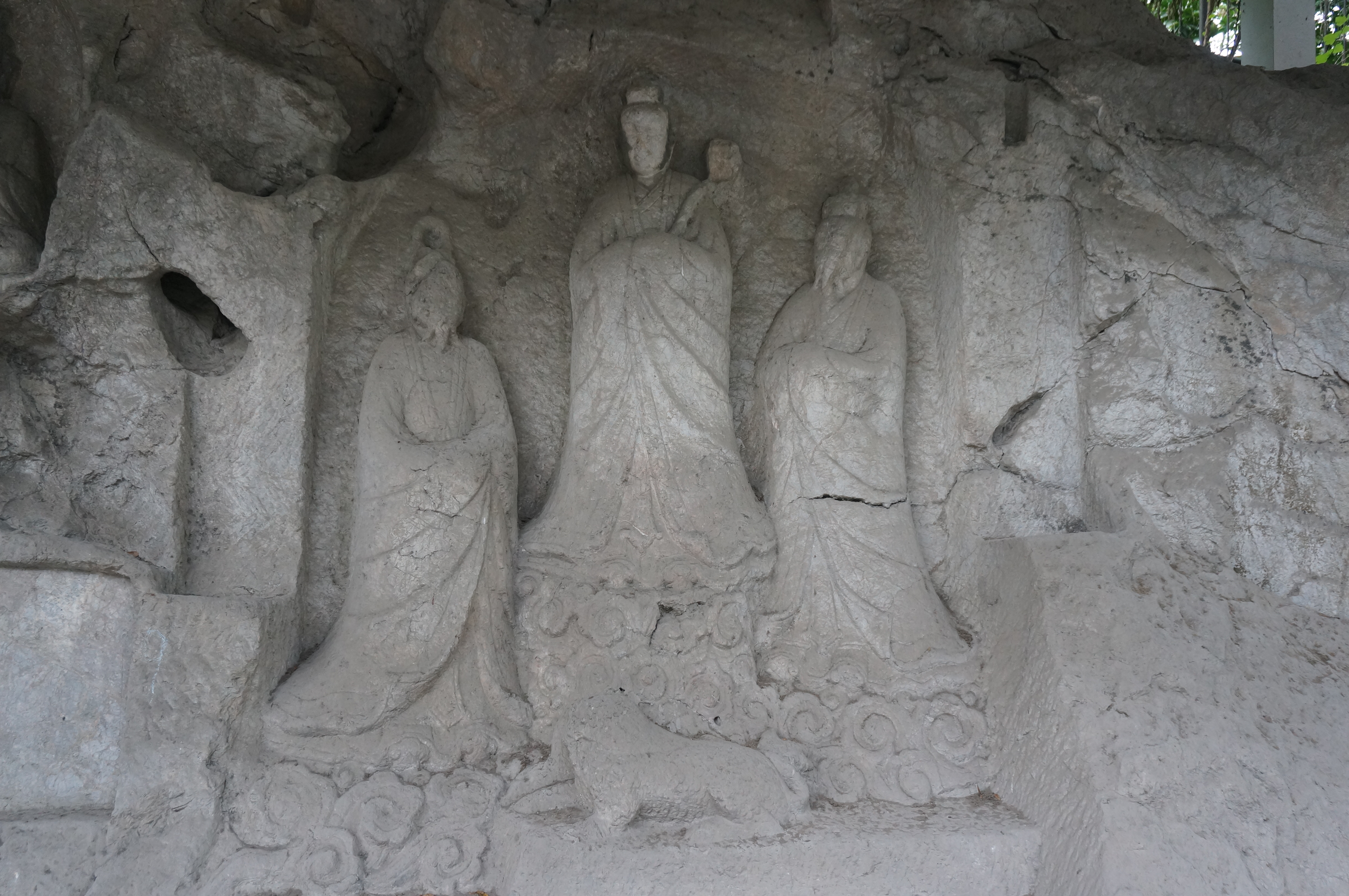
Stone Carvings at Tongxuan Taoist Temple.

The three gods are known by different titles. Mao Ying is the Great Mao Lord (大茅君), Mao Gu is the Middle Mao Lord (中茅君), and Mao Zhong is the Lesser Mao Lord (小茅君). Mao Ying holds the office of Siming (司命), which keeps records of life and death. Mao Gu holds the office of Dinglu (定祿), and Mao Zhong holds the office of Baoming (保命). Their offices also decide who may become an immortal.

The brothers appear in the Zhenling Weiye Tu (真靈位業圖), compiled by Tao Hongjing. The book places them at different ranks among the Daoist immortals. Several Song dynasty emperors later gave them new titles. In 1249, Emperor Lizong of Song granted the brothers further honours at the request of the Daoist priest Situ Shitan (司徒師坦). The orders and ceremonies were collected by Zhang Dachun (張大淳) in the Sanmao Zhenjun Jiafeng Shidian (三茅真君加封事典).

The Jiuxiao Wanfu Palace (九霄萬福宮) stands on the highest peak of Maoshan. It has long been a place of worship for the three gods and received its present name in 1598.

During the nineteenth century, many people from Suzhou, Changzhou, Yangzhou, and Shanghai travelled to Maoshan to worship the brothers. Pilgrims came mainly between the twelfth and third lunar months. Some towns also had smaller temples for people who could not make the journey.

Stone images of the three gods survive at the former Tongxuan Guan (通玄觀) in Hangzhou. They stand beneath an image of Yuanshi Tianzun. The image of Mao Ying is 1.4 metres tall, while those of his brothers are 1.2 metres tall.

== Religious texts ==
The Mao brothers also appear in baojuan (precious scrolls). Some versions tell the story of the Mao brothers, while others name three brothers called Jin Qian (金乾), Jin Kun (金坤), and Jin Fu (金福). In Jingjiang, these stories were recited during local religious gatherings.

An edition of the Sanmao Dijun Baochan (三茅帝君寶懺) was printed in Shanghai in 1924. It contains prayers and texts used in ceremonies for the three gods. It also records a message received through spirit-writing that gave them the title Sanmao Dijun (三茅帝君), or Three Mao Imperial Lords.
