= Empress Chenggong =

Empress Chenggong may refer to:

- Du Lingyang (321–341), wife of Emperor Cheng of Jin
- Empress Xia (Song dynasty) (1136–1167), wife of Emperor Xiaozong of Song
