= Situ Shitan =

Taoist priest during the Southern Song dynasty

Situ Shitan (simplified Chinese: 司徒师坦; traditional Chinese: 司徒師坦; pinyin: Sītú Shītǎn) was a Taoist priest during the Southern Song dynasty. He came from Jintan, in present-day Jiangsu, and studied Taoism at Maoshan. He served under Emperor Lizong of Song as the Left Street Daoist Registrar (左街道錄).

== Life ==
Situ Shitan was also known as Kongshan (空山). He studied at Chongxi Guan (崇禧觀) on Maoshan. Emperor Lizong later summoned him to the capital, Lin'an, and gave him the title Dongwei Xiansheng (洞微先生). He performed Taoist ceremonies at Maoshan and received several imperial gifts.

In 1249, Situ was appointed Left Street Daoist Registrar (左街道錄), a high government post responsible for managing Daoist affairs in the court. He asked the emperor to grant new titles to Sanmao Zhenjun instead. After several petitions, the emperor agreed, and Situ later accepted the appointment. He led the ceremonies for the three gods at Maoshan on the 23rd day of the fourth lunar month.

Situ died at the age of 76. His birth and death years are not known. His disciple Zhang Dachun (張大淳) later compiled the Sanmao Zhenjun Jiafeng Shidian (三茅真君加封事典). The book contains imperial orders, petitions, prayers, and records of the ceremonies held in 1249. Its preface is dated 1267.
