= Empress Xie (Xiaozong) =

Empress Chengsu 成肅皇后
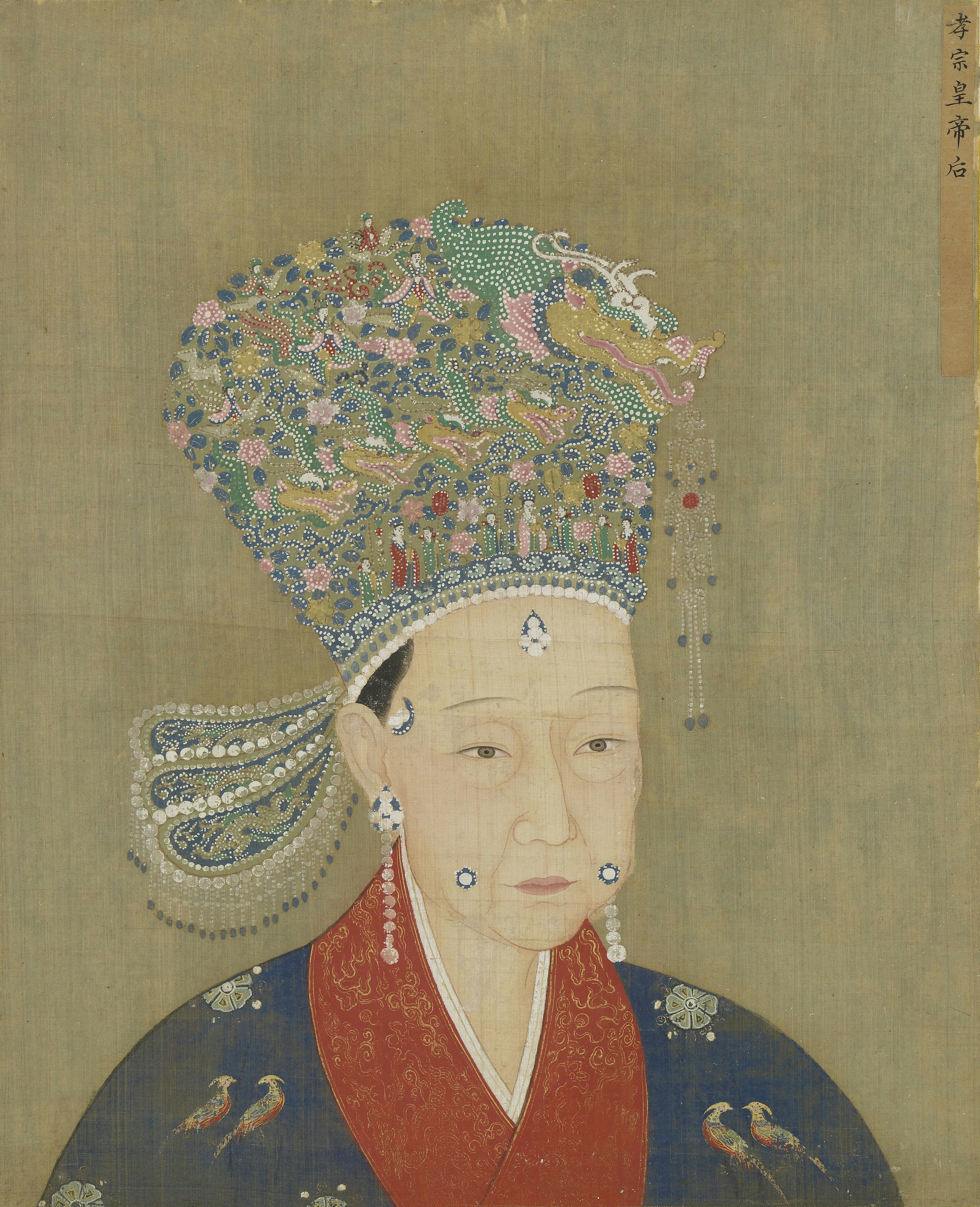

Empress consort of the Southern Song dynasty
- Tenure: 12 September 1176 – 18 February 1189
- Predecessor: Empress Chenggong
- Successor: Empress Cixian

Empress dowager of the Southern Song dynasty
- Tenure: 18 February 1189 – 21 October 1202

Grand empress dowager of the Southern Song dynasty
- Tenure: 21 October 1202 – 13 June 1207
- Born: 1135; Danyang, Jiangsu, China
- Died: 13 June 1207 (aged c. 72); Lin'an, Zhejiang, China
- Burial: Yongfuling (永阜陵); Shaoxing, Zhejiang
- Spouse: Emperor Xiaozong
Posthumous name
- Empress Chengsu (成肅皇后)
- Father: Xia Ning

Empress Xie (1135 – 13 June 1207) was a Chinese empress consort of the Song dynasty, married to Emperor Xiaozong of Song.

== As Empress ==
Xie was selected as a concubine (and later consort) for Emperor Xiaozong by Empress Dowager Wu, who lamented his disinterest in women after the death of his second empress, Empress Xia. While Xie eventually became his primary consort, she had no surviving children.

Unlike other Empresses in the Southern Song Dynasty who made an effort at participating in politics, Empress Xie had a rather politically detached personality and lived through much of the ensuing reigns until the thirteenth year of Emperor Ningzong's reign. However, she was described as "diligent, fair and frugal" when it came to managing matters in the inner palace.

Empress Xie was a reserved and non-meddling woman who lived in silence herself, having barely received any affection from her spouse and relatives. Thus, she was widely considered a tragic and lonely figure despite her elevated position.

== Notes ==
Chinese royalty
Preceded by Empress Xia	Empress of China; 1176–1189	Succeeded by Empress Li Fengniang
