= Xiaozong =

Xiaozong can be the name of the following Chinese emperors:

- Emperor Xiaozong of Song China (reign: 1162–1189)
- Hongzhi Emperor of the Ming Dynasty (reign: 1487–1505)
