= Zhao Hong (Song dynasty) =

Chinese prince (1207–1225)

Zhao Hong/Zhao Guihe 趙竑/趙貴和

Prince of Zhen 鎮王
- Reign: posthumously honored in 1275

Duke of Baling 巴陵郡公
- Reign: posthumously demoted in 1225

Prince of Jiyang 濟陽郡王 Prince of Ji 濟王
- Reign: 1225

Crown Prince of Southern Song dynasty
- Reign: 1221-1224
- Predecessor: Zhao Xun 趙詢
- Successor: vacant, Zhao Qi

Duke of Ji 濟國公
- Reign: 1222

Duke of Qi 祁國公
- Reign: 1221

Hereditary Prince of Yi 沂王後
- Reign: 1206-1221
- Predecessor: Zhao Bing
- Successor: Zhao Guicheng
- Born: c. 1207
- Died: 1225 (aged 17–18)
- Spouse: Lady Wu
- Issue: Zhao Quan, Marquess of Yongling 永寧侯趙銓
Posthumous name
- Zhao Su 昭肅; Prince Zhaosu of Zhen 鎮昭肅王
- Father: Zhao Xiqu 趙希瞿; Zhao Bing, Prince of Yi 沂王趙抦 (adopted)

Zhao Hong
- Traditional Chinese: 趙竑
- Simplified Chinese: 赵竑
Transcriptions
Standard Mandarin
- Hanyu Pinyin: Zhào Hóng
- Wade–Giles: Chao Hung

Zhao Hong (c. 1207 – February 1225) was a crown prince of the Song dynasty, the heir apparent of Emperor Ningzong.

== Biography ==
Zhao Hong was the adopted son of Zhao Bing, who in turn waings the biological grandson of Emperor Xiaozong. Zhao Hong was therefore, an adopted nephew of the reigning Emperor Ningzong.

When the Crown Prince Zhao Xun died in 1220 from dysentery, Emperor Ningzong asked for a boy at least 14 years old to adopt. Zhao Hong was selected, adopted, and installed as Crown Prince in 1221.

=== Deposal ===
The powerful chancellor Shi Miyuan did not want Zhao Hong to succeed Ningzong when he died because Shi Miyuan once found Zhao Hong sober and passed out on his quarters and in 1223, a lute-playing girl forced to act like a spy by Shi Miyuan spied on Zhao Hong and reported to Shi that once Zhao Hong would become Emperor, he would banish and exile Shi Miyuan and his subordinates to the far south. Shi Miyuan not wanting to lose his power decided to send his ally Yu Tianxi to locate a suitable heir. Yu found Zhao Yuju, a minor official in Shaoxing and sent him to Shi. Shi decided to groom him as the potential heir renaming him Zhao Guicheng and forced Empress Yang onto the plot.

When Emperor Ningzong died, Shi Miyuan first brought Zhao Guicheng into the throne room and put him on the throne and then called Zhao Hong into the room without any bodyguards. Shi Miyuan then said that Zhao Guicheng was now the Emperor sparking protests from Zhao Hong until he was forced to bow in recognition of Zhao Guicheng. Zhao Hong was moved to a nearby prefecture, Huzhou where he could live in luxury.

=== Death ===
Zhao Hong was persuaded to join a rebellion after much resistance from him. He was however defeated after two weeks. He was executed by strangulation in February 1225.

Zhao Hong (Song dynasty) House of Zhao Born: c. 1207 Died: 1225
Regnal titles
Preceded by Zhao Xun	Crown Prince of the Song dynasty 1221–1224	Vacant Title next held by Zhao Qi
