= Empress Han =

Empress Gongshu 恭淑皇后

Empress consort of the Southern Song dynasty
- Tenure: 25 July 1194 – 14 December 1200
- Predecessor: Empress Cixian
- Successor: Empress Gongsheng
- Born: 1165
- Died: 14 December 1200 (aged c. 35); Lin'an, Zhejiang, China
- Spouse: Emperor Ningzong
- Issue: Zhao Jun; Zhao Tan
Posthumous name
- Empress Gongshu (恭淑皇后)
- Clan: Han

Empress Han (1165 – 14 December 1200) was the empress consort of Emperor Ningzong during the Song dynasty.

== Biography ==
Han was born in modern-day Henan, the descendant of a prominent Northern Song official. She became a concubine of Ningzong along with her older sister. She was selected as the primary consort of Ningzong, and appointed his empress after his succession. Empress Han and her family managed to attain influence over the affairs of state, backed by the so called 'War/Militant party', succeed in persuading Ningzong to depose and disgrace senior minister Zhao Ruyu and replaced him with her militarist relative, Han Tuozhou.

Chinese royalty
| Preceded by Empress Li Fengniang | Empress of China; 1194–1200 | Succeeded by Empress Gongsheng |
