= Zhao Xun (Song dynasty) =

Chinese prince (1192–1220)

Zhao Xun 趙詢

Crown Prince of the Song dynasty
- Reign: 1207–1220
- Predecessor: Title Vacant
- Successor: Zhao Hong
- Emperor: Emperor Ningzong
- Born: 1192
- Died: 1220 (aged 27–28)
- House: House of Zhao
- Father: Zhao Xibang

Zhao Xun
- Chinese: 趙詢
Transcriptions
Standard Mandarin
- Hanyu Pinyin: Zhào Xún

Zhao Yan
- Chinese: 趙曮
Transcriptions
Standard Mandarin
- Hanyu Pinyin: Zháo Yǎn

Zhao Yuyuan
- Chinese: 趙與願
Transcriptions
Standard Mandarin
- Hanyu Pinyin: Zháo Yǔyuàn

Zhao Chou
- Chinese: 趙幬
Transcriptions
Standard Mandarin
- Hanyu Pinyin: Zháo Chóu

Zhao Xun (趙詢, 1192–1220) was a Chinese prince. He was the first of the three adopted crown princes of the childless Emperor Ningzong. He was a descendant of Emperor Taizu through Zhao Dezhao. He was skilled at calligraphy.

== As Crown Prince ==
His original name was Zhao Yuyuan and he originally lived in Qingtian. When he was only 6, he was adopted by the childless Emperor Ningzong in 1198. After he was adopted, he changed his name to Zhao Yan.

In 1202, he worshipped the military martial arts. He became Crown Prince in 1207. Zhao Yan's son, Zhao Naiyu (趙乃裕), was born around this time but the exact date is unknown. Zhao Naiyu's profile in Geni estimates his birth between 1197 and 1257. It is more likely however, that an accurate estimated birth range is from 1205 to 1220.

Zhao Yan changed his name to Zhao Chu at an unspecified date. Zhao Chu was renamed Zhao Xun at an unspecified date. He died from dysentery in 1220. He was given the posthumous name Jingxian Taizi (景献太子).
