= Empress Xia (Song dynasty) =

Empress Chenggong 成恭皇后

Empress consort of the Southern Song dynasty
- Tenure: 16 November 1163 – 13 July 1167
- Predecessor: Empress Xiansheng
- Successor: Empress Chengsu
- Born: 1136
- Died: 14 December 1167 (aged c. 31); Lin'an, Zhejiang, China
- Spouse: Emperor Xiaozong
Posthumous name
- Empress Chenggong (成恭皇后)

Empress Xia Shenfu (1136 – 13 July 1167) was a Chinese empress consort of the Song dynasty, married to Emperor Xiaozong of Song.

Xia originally served as a maid to the first spouse of Xiaozong, who died in 1156 when he was still prince. In 1162, he married Xia as his second main spouse, and in 1163, he gave her the title of empress. She had one son and one daughter, both of whom died very young.

== Sources ==
Chinese royalty
Preceded by Empress Xiansheng	Empress of China; 1163–1167	Succeeded by Empress Chengsu
