= Zhao Xun (theater theorist) =

Chinese theater theorist and activist (1920-2010)

Zhao Xun (January 1920 - December 26, 2010, Chinese: 赵寻), formerly known as Zhao Xinsheng (Chinese: 赵辛生), was born in Wuhan, Hubei Province. He was a Chinese theater theorist and theater activist.

== Biography ==
In 1936, while studying at the Wenhua Middle School in Wuchang, Zhao joined the Daguang Reading Club, a progressive organization organized by Zhang Guangnian, and embarked on the path of patriotism and salvation, and then participated in Wuhan's famous anti-war and salvation performance group, "Pioneer Theatre Troupe". 1939, Zhao joined the Yan'an Theatre Troupe in Yan'an and joined the Chinese Communist Party in the same year. He served as a publicity member of the Topland Drama Troupe, the seventh team of the Drama Mobile of the All-China Drama Association, the deputy head of the third team of the Anti-Enemy Drama, and the head of the playwriting team of the North China University.

In 1949, he was the deputy director of the Creative Writing Office of the Central Academy of Drama. In the 1950s, Zhao returned to Wuhan to take part in the construction of Wuhan Steel, presided over the preparation of the first "History of Wuhan Steel", and later served as the secretary of the China Drama Association. He was persecuted during the Cultural Revolution. After the end of the Cultural Revolution, he served as a researcher of the Academy of Literature and Research of the Ministry of Culture, head of the leading group of art periodicals of the Ministry of Culture, deputy secretary of the Party group and executive secretary of the Secretariat of the China Federation of Literary and Art Circles, executive deputy chairman of the China Association of Television and Audiovisual Arts (CAVMA), general manager and editor-in-chief of the China Federation of Literary and Audiovisual Arts (CFLA) Publishing Company, secretary of the sub-party group of the China Theatre Association (CTA), the executive vice-chairman of the third and fourth terms of the CTA, and adviser to the fifth, sixth, and seventh terms of the CTA.

In 2009, he was honored with the Lifetime Achievement Award of the First China Drama Award. He also participated in the founding of the China Television Artists Association, the China Acrobatic Artists Association, and other national associations and groups of literary artists.

Mr. Zhao was a member of the Sixth and Seventh National Committees of the Chinese People's Political Consultative Conference (CPPCC). Zhao Xun died in Beijing on December 26, 2010 at the age of 91 due to illness.
