= Shi Miyuan =

Shi Miyuan 史彌遠
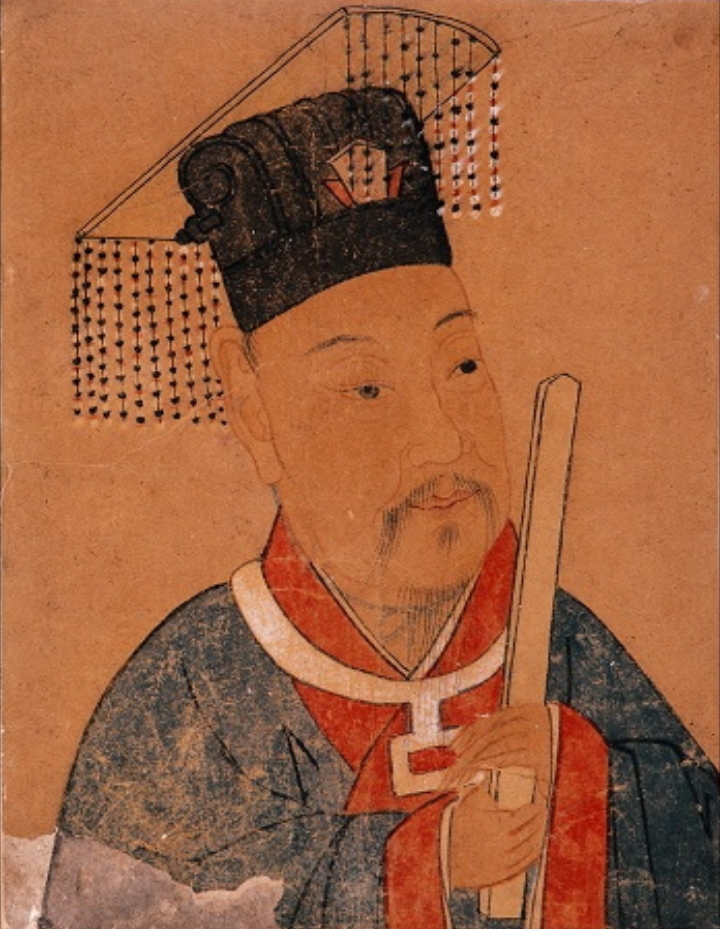

Grand Chancellor of the Song Dynasty
- In office November 19, 1208 – December 31, 1208
- Monarch: Emperor Ningzong
- Preceded by: Han Tuozhou
- Succeeded by: Qian Xiangzu
- In office June 7, 1209 – November 27, 1233
- Monarchs: Emperor Ningzong; Emperor Lizong
- Preceded by: Qian Xiangzu
- Succeeded by: Zheng Qingzhi

Personal details
- Born: February 23, 1164; Ningbo, Ming Prefecture, Southern Song
- Died: November 27, 1233 (aged 69); Lin'an, Southern Song
- Parent: Shi Hao
- Occupation: Politician

Shi Miyuan (Chinese: 史彌遠; Wade–Giles: Shih Mi-yüan; February 23, 1164 – November 27, 1233) was a Chinese politician during the Southern Song Dynasty. He was instrumental in installing Emperor Lizong on the throne, despite the fact that Lizong was not in the line of succession. Under Lizong's rule, Shi was appointed Grand Chancellor.

Shi hailed from a family of bureaucrats and was adept in politics. He took the Imperial examinations at the age of only seventeen, and placed first in his class. After the dismissal of Han Tuozhou as Chief Councillor, Shi was appointed to the position in 1208 (a number of historians accuse Shi of orchestrating Han's murder). Once in power, he reversed many of Han's policies, making peace with the Jin and revoking proscriptions against the Neo-Confucianism of Zhu Xi, although he still did not allow adherents of Zhu Xi's theories any great political power. He generally promoted officials on merit and was able to restore a degree of stability to government.

== Imperial succession ==
When the Emperor Ningzong died in 1224, the succession wasn't known as Ningzong had not designated an heir. Ningzong's eldest son had died in 1197 and all of his other sons were dead too so the appointed heir was therefore adopted (the crown prince in 1224 was actually the third boy Ningzong had adopted for the role). Shi moved to place Zhao Yun (a minor imperial prince) on the throne ahead of the heir apparent. In some histories, it is suggested that Shi placed a lute-playing courtesan in the crown prince's company, and through her learned of the heir apparent's plot to remove Shi from power after attaining the throne. In changing the order of succession, he had the unwilling support of Empress Yang, who was initially against the plot but was forced to assist after Shi threatened to exterminate her clan. She forged an edict appointing Zhao Yun as heir, and he was crowned as the Emperor Lizong.

Shi Miyuan died in office in 1233 and was succeeded by Zheng Qingzhi.
