= Han Tuozhou =

Chinese politician (1152–1207)

Han Tuozhou 韓侂胄

Grand Chancellor of the Song Dynasty
- In office July 23, 1205 – November 24, 1207
- Monarch: Emperor Ningzong
- Preceded by: Chen Ziqiang
- Succeeded by: Shi Miyuan

Personal details
- Born: November 6, 1152
- Died: November 24, 1207 (aged 55); Lin'an, Southern Song
- Relatives: Empress Han
- Occupation: Politician

Han Tuozhou
- Traditional Chinese: 韓侂胄
- Simplified Chinese: 韩侂胄
Transcriptions
Standard Mandarin
- Hanyu Pinyin: Hán Tuōzhòu
- Wade–Giles: Han T'o-chou

Han Tuozhou (November 6, 1152 – November 24, 1207) was a Chinese politician of the Southern Song dynasty, who served as a chancellor under Emperor Ningzong.

He was responsible for Southern Song efforts to recover territories lost in northern China to the Jurchen-led Jin dynasty in their 1142 peace settlement that ended the Jin–Song wars. In his efforts to begin a military build-up, he had Yue Fei (who had resigned during peace talks with the Jin dynasty, after which he was jailed and poisoned) posthumously promoted and Qin Hui (who led the aforementioned peace talks with the Jin dynasty) demoted. These efforts were unsuccessful, and the ensuing war was devastating to southern China, resulting in further territorial losses and terrible inflation. In consequence, Han was executed by the Southern Song dynasty, and his head was offered to the Jin dynasty as a peace offering.

Han Tuozhou is also famous for his opposition to daoxue (the Song's Neo-Confucianist movement) which was banned on his order during the years 1195–99. His antagonizing policies were reversed by his successor in office, Shi Miyuan.

Han was assassinated by bludgeoning in 1207, on his way to the imperial palace. This was an exceptional affair in the generally tolerant political atmosphere of the Song. Yuan dynasty historiographers assigned the blame of assassination on Shi Miyuan. However, such judgement is questioned. More plausibly, his extermination was ordered by Empress Yang who succeeded the deceased niece of Han Tuozhou, Empress Han (d.1200)

Han's and Su Shidan's (蘇師旦, subordinate of Han) bodies were exhumed and presented to the Jin dynasty as compensation for the Southern Song's aggression, in the negotiation process carried out by Wang Nan and Xu Yi. This measure was probably undertaken as compensation for the humiliation of Jin confederate Wu Xi (吳曦), whose body was hung on displays in Xingzhou (興州, in modern Lueyang, Shaanxi) and Lin'an. On some accounts, the Jin dynasty provided Han with honorary burial, recognizing him as a loyal official.
