= Emperor Lizong =

Emperor of Song China from 1224 to 1264

Emperor Lizong of Song 宋理宗
- Emperor Lizong's portrait drawn after his death, kept in the National Palace Museum.

Emperor of the Song dynasty
- Reign: 17 September 1224 – 16 November 1264
- Coronation: 17 September 1224
- Predecessor: Emperor Ningzong
- Successor: Emperor Duzong
- Born: Zhao Yuju (1205–1222); Zhao Guicheng (1222–1224); Zhao Yun (1224–1264); 26 January 1205; Shaoxing, Song dynasty
- Died: 16 November 1264 (aged 59); Lin'an, Song dynasty (modern Hangzhou, Zhejiang)
- Burial: Yongmu Mausoleum (永穆陵, in present-day Shaoxing, Zhejiang)
- Consorts: Empress Shouhe (m. 1227–1264)
- Issue Detail: Emperor Duzong (adopted)
Era dates
- Baoqing (寶慶; 1225–1227); Shaoding (紹定; 1228–1233); Duanping (端平; 1234–1236); Jiaxi (嘉熙; 1237–1240); Chunyou (淳祐; 1241–1252); Baoyou (寶祐; 1253–1258); Kaiqing (開慶; 1259); Jingding (景定; 1260–1264)
Posthumous name
- Short: Emperor An (安帝); Full: Emperor Jiandao Beide Dagong Fuxing Liewen Renwu Shengming Anxiao (建道備德大功復興烈文仁武聖明安孝皇帝)
Temple name
- Lizong (理宗)
- House: Zhao
- Dynasty: Song (Southern Song)
- Father: Zhao Xilu
- Mother: Lady Quan

Emperor Lizong of Song
- Chinese: 宋理宗
- Literal meaning: "Model Ancestor of the Song"
Transcriptions
Standard Mandarin
- Hanyu Pinyin: Sòng Lǐzōng
- Wade–Giles: Sung Litsung
- IPA: [sʊ̂ŋ lì.tsʊ́ŋ]

Zhao Yun
- Traditional Chinese: 趙昀
- Simplified Chinese: 赵昀
Transcriptions
Standard Mandarin
- Hanyu Pinyin: Zhào Yún
- Wade–Giles: Chao Yün
- IPA: [ʈʂâʊ y̌n]

Zhao Yuju
- Traditional Chinese: 趙與莒
- Simplified Chinese: 赵与莒
Transcriptions
Standard Mandarin
- Hanyu Pinyin: Zhào Yǔjú
- Wade–Giles: Chao Yüchü
- IPA: [ʈʂâʊ y̌.tɕù]

Zhao Guicheng
- Traditional Chinese: 趙貴誠
- Simplified Chinese: 赵贵诚
Transcriptions
Standard Mandarin
- Hanyu Pinyin: Zhào Guìchéng
- Wade–Giles: Chao Kueich'eng
- IPA: [ʈʂâʊ kwêɪ.ʈʂʰə̌ŋ]

Emperor Lizong of Song (26 January 1205 – 16 November 1264), personal name Zhao Yun, was the 14th emperor of the Song dynasty of China and the fifth emperor of the Southern Song dynasty. He reigned from 1224 to 1264.

His original name was Zhao Yuju but later changed his name to Zhao Guicheng and then finally changed his name to Zhao Yun being elevated to an imperial son. Although he was a descendant of the Song dynasty's founder Zhao Kuangyin (Emperor Taizu) through his son Zhao Dezhao and hence a member of the imperial clan, Zhao Yun was not in line to succeed to the throne as his family had no political status. Shi Miyuan, the Chancellor for many years, collaborated with Empress Dowager Yang and when Emperor Ningzong eventually died in 1224, Shi Miyuan, along with Empress Dowager Yang, supplanted the reigning crown prince Zhao Hong and replaced him with Zhao Yun as emperor, reigning with the era name Baoqing and the temple name Lizong. In his 40-year-reign of Emperor Lizong did little to nothing to improve the Dynasty and instead sought pleasure even as the Mongols were terrorizing the borders. He died at age 59 in 1264 and was succeeded by his nephew Emperor Duzong.

== Early life ==
Although related to the Song imperial family, Emperor Lizong was only distantly related as he was the 10th generation descendant of the founding Song Emperor, Emperor Taizu more than 250 years before. Emperor Lizong spent his childhood in obscurity living away from the imperial court in Shaoxing, Zhejiang as a minor official. One rainy day in his early teens, along with his younger brother Zhao Yurui, Lizong stood huddling under a bridge along with an official, Yu Tianxi, who was sent by Chancellor Shi Miyuan tasked to locate a suitable successor to the Song throne as the incumbent crown prince Zhao Xun has recently died at the age of 29. After discovering the true identity of this teenager, Yu quickly informed Shi Miyuan who agreed to groom Lizong to be replaced as the crown prince. It is said that Lizong was serious, studious, mostly silent, and wise before assuming the throne. When Ningzong died in 1224, Shi Miyuan told Lizong to enter the throne room and then ordered Zhao Hong, then the current crown prince into the room. Shi Miyuan subsequently declared Lizong emperor and according to history, he was wearing a white robe and the lights reflected his shadow on the throne. The result of Lizong becoming Emperor angered Zhao Hong who refused to bow until he was forced to by the palace commander. He was then sent away.

== Reign ==
Lizong's long reign of 40 years did little to improve the predicament of the Song Empire in his time. The court of Emperor Lizong was dominated by consort clans, Yan and Jia, the eunuchs Dong Songchen and Lu Yunsheng, and his Co-Regent Empress Dowager Yang. The Emperor was uninterested in governmental affairs, and for the first decade of his rule he delegated matters into the hands of his ministers, notably Shi Miyuan, who was the de facto ruler in his absence. Many critics blamed Lizong's leadership for the eventual fall of the Song dynasty.

A year after Emperor Lizong took the throne, he honored Zhu Xi with the posthumous name Duke of Hui (徽國公). Lizong faced a minor rebellion led by the former crown prince Zhao Hong which was put down after two weeks; Zhao Hong himself was executed on the orders of Empress Dowager Yang.

From the winter of 1230 to the autumn of 1231, the Mongols forcibly passed through the Song Dynasty. In the region centered on the three passes of Shukou, they entered into a series of battles with the Song army. This was the second and largest armed conflict between them before the Mongol conquest of Song officially began. This forced Lizong who being strongly influenced by Empress Dowager Yang to ally with the Mongols as they might conquer the Song.

Wuzhun Shifan, a monk was summoned by Emperor Lizong in 1233. Emperor Lizong discussed with Wuzhun about Zen Buddhism, and Dharma.

After the deaths of Empress Dowager Yang and Shi Miyuan in 1233, Emperor Lizong assumed full authority briefly but again quickly abandoned the responsibility of ruling and delegated matters to his chancellor Ding Daquan in order to pursue personal enjoyment. It was said that the emperor often drank wine a lot, frequented brothels and invited prostitutes into the palace in his late years, which was vehemently opposed by his ministers.

Notable events during Emperor Lizong's reign included the demise of the Jurchen-led Jin dynasty in 1234, which was obliterated by the joint forces of the Mongol Empire and the Song Dynasty. The Jurchens had fought multiple wars with the Song Empire decades before it was conquered by the Mongols and although their ruler Emperor Aizong tried to make peace with the Song Dynasty to warn them that if the Mongols conquered the Jin Dynasty and they would attack the Song next, Emperor Lizong ignored the warning and the Jin dynasty fell in 1234.

=== The Start of the Mongol Invasion ===
==== Siege of Luoyang ====
Once the Jin dynasty has fallen, the Song dynasty attempted to take back its northern territories originally occupied by the Jin and took back Luoyang and Kaifeng in July 1234. However, in September 1234, the Mongols counterattacked with the siege of Luoyang. The Song army holding Luoyang was short of food supplies. Additionally, the Mongols diverted the water of Yellow River into the city causing great casualties among the Song army. The fall of Luoyang was simply a prologue of a series of upcoming battles which lasted decades. The fall of Luoyang also began the official start of the Mongol conquest of the Song dynasty. The Mongols blamed the Song for "breaking the alliance". However, it was more of an excuse for further Mongol expeditions.

Other notable events include the Song's ally Dali falling to the Mongols.

Emperor Lizong met Zhao Yifu (1189–1256), who was a minister and a defender of Jiangnan. Lizong started to Yifu, "You have had two years of great toil, minister." Yifu said "My memorials have all reflected Your Majesty's virtue. I have not had a hair of merit." Emperor Lizong replied "You discussed urgent matters like preventing rebellions, imperial succession, and the drought that hit Jiangnan and Hunan." Yifu then said "King Tang reproached himself over the six affairs. Your Majesty should determine whether in the present circumstances there is a 'six affairs' [situation]." Yifu was named imperial reader-in-waiting the next day.

In 1241, Töregene Khatun had sent an envoy to make peace proposals and discuss with Emperor Lizong. However, the Song court arrested the envoy and imprisoned him in a fortress with his suite of seventy people. The envoy died, but his suite were detained until 1254. That year the Mongol army attacked to take Hejiu but failed. The Chinese freed the suite of the late envoy to show their desire for peace.

The New Khan Möngke concentrated all his attention on the conquest of the Song dynasty. Taking personal command late in the decade, he captured many of the fortified cities along the northern front. In October 1257 Möngke set out for South China, leaving his administration to his brother, Ariq Böke.

Wen Tianxiang and Lu Xiufu passed the imperial examination where Emperor Lizong personally gave Wen first rank.

In 1259, the Song government was forced to capitulate and cede all territories north of the Yangtze River to the Mongols. Despite this, Möngke Khan was killed earlier in the year in a siege with no designated heir setting the stage for the Division of the Mongol Empire. The invasions frightened Lizong to the extent that he attempted to move the Song capital but was stopped by his Empress Xie Daoqing; she thought that if they moved, it would create chaos among the people.

In 1260, Jia Sidao became chancellor who would eventually soon take control over the new emperor Zhao Qi after Lizong's death and expel his opponents like Wen Tianxiang and Li Fu.

In December 1261, Lizong arranged a marriage between his adopted son Zhao Qi and the 33-year-old Quan Jiu. Quan Jiu was a grandniece of Lizong's mother (who had by then died) making Quan a cousin of Zhao Qi. An account in Quan's official biography stated that Lizong ordered her to enter the palace where he greeted her, "Your father Zhaosun died in the service of his majesty in the Baoyou reign, the very thought of which makes me grieve." Quan replied "My father can be remembered, but even more should the plight of the masses of the Huai and Hu regions be remembered!" greatly impressing Lizong who said to his high-ranking officials "The words of this daughter of the Quan family are particularly grandiloquent. A betrothal should be arranged with the heir-apparent to permit continuation of the ritual line."

Internal-combustion rocket propulsion is mentioned in a reference to 1264, recording that the "ground-rat", a type of firework, had frightened the Empress-Mother Gongsheng at a feast held in her honor by her son Emperor Lizong.

Also in 1264, Emperor Lizong died sonless (his sons died prematurely) from an illness and was succeeded by his adopted son and biological nephew, Zhao Qi, known as Emperor Duzong after his death.

One of his daughters married a descendant of Zhu Xi.

== Calligraphy ==
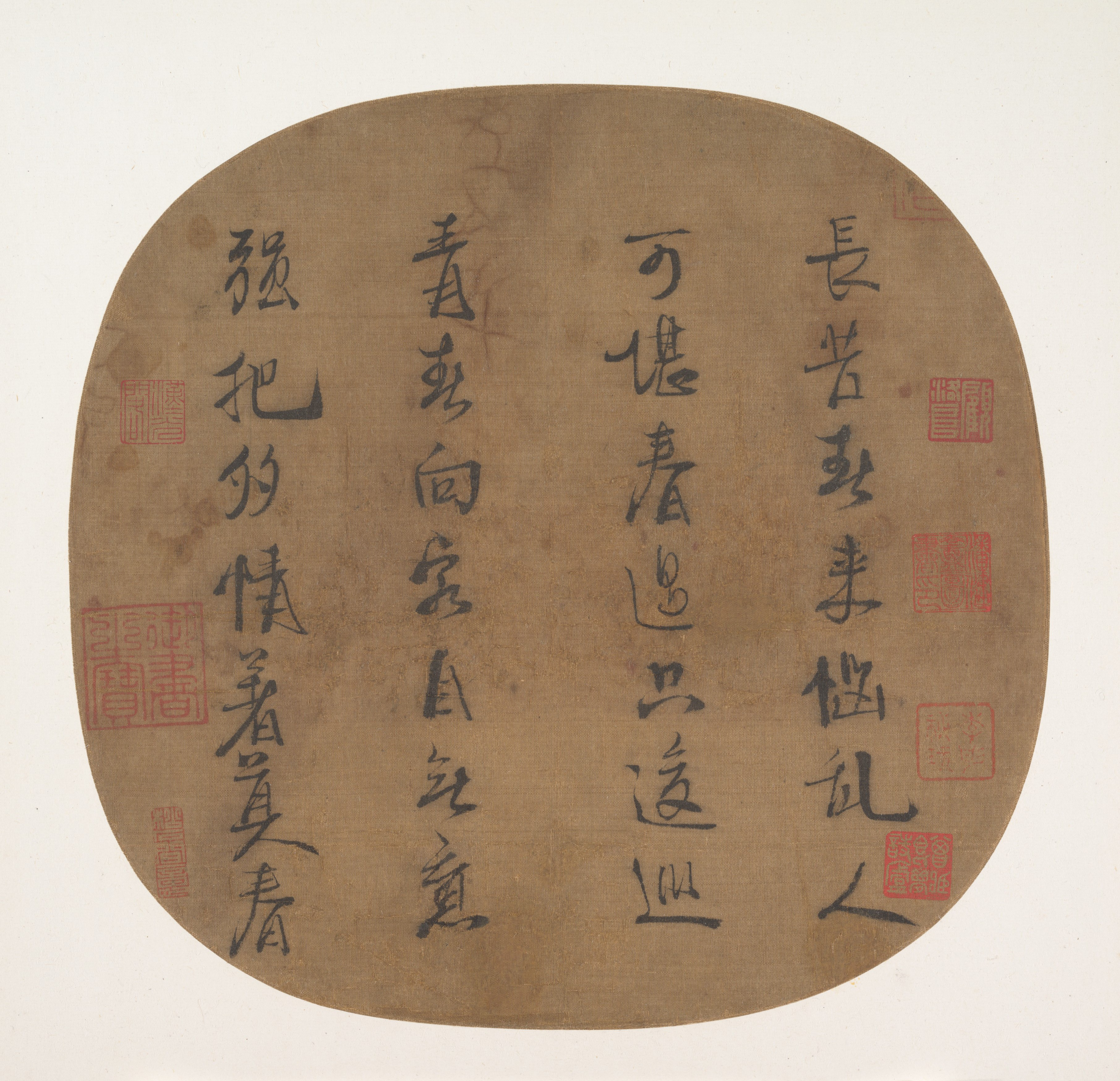
Quatrain on Late Spring, by Emperor Lizong.

Emperor Lizong was a skilled poet and calligrapher. The Metropolitan Museum reports, "Lizong was the finest calligrapher among the Song emperors who came after Gaozong (r. 1127–62)." Lizong developed his own unique calligraphic style which was easily recognizable as it showed sharp and rapid brush strokes. The Metropolitan Museum says, "Lizong developed his own unique manner, which was distinguished by angular brushstrokes with straight rapid brush movements—in contrast to the slower, more rounded brushstrokes of Gaozong—and by his preference for Tang, rather than Jin, dynasty models." Emperor Lizong also expresses his feelings in his poems as shown in his poem 'Quatrain on Late Spring' which reads:

How spring makes me sad!
Timidly I bear the passing of spring.
The young lady has no feeling for me,
She treats my love merely as that of a waning spring.

In this poem, it is clearly established that Emperor Lizong laments old age.

== Taboo words ==
The following logographs, impinging on Lizong's personal name, were forbidden to be written in full: 昀, 勻, 畇 (all read "Yún"); 馴, 巡 (both read "Xún").

== Family ==
- Empress Shouhe, of the Xie clan (壽和皇后 謝氏; 1210–1283), personal name Daoqing (道清)
  - Zhao Wei, Prince Chongzhao of Qi (祁衝昭王 趙維; 1238), 3rd son
- Noble Consort, of the Jia clan (惠順貴妃 賈氏; 1213–1246)
  - Princess Zhouhan Duanxiao (周漢端孝公主; 1241–1262), 1st daughter
    - Married Yang Zhen (杨镇) in 1261
- Noble Consort, of the Yan clan (惠昭貴妃 閻氏; d. 1260)
- Unknown
  - Zhao Ji, Prince Chong'an of Yong (永衝安王 趙緝), 1st son
  - Zhao Yi, Prince Chongchun of Zhao (昭衝純王 趙繹), 2nd son
  - Princess Zhenzhu (珍珠公主)
    - Married Xie Bi (谢壁)
  - A daughter who married Zhu Jun (朱浚)

Adopted Issue:

- Zhao Qi, Duzong (度宗 趙禥; 1240–1274)

== See also ==
- Chinese emperors family tree (middle)
- List of emperors of the Song dynasty
- Architecture of the Song dynasty
- Culture of the Song dynasty
- Economy of the Song dynasty
- History of the Song dynasty
- Society of the Song dynasty
- Technology of the Song dynasty
- Wuzhun Shifan
- Jin–Song Wars

Emperor Lizong House of Zhao Born: 1205 Died: 1264
Regnal titles
Preceded by Emperor Ningzong	Emperor of the Song dynasty 1224–1264	Succeeded by Emperor Duzong
