= Emperor Guangzong of Song =

Emperor of China from 1189 to 1194

Emperor Guangzong of Song 宋光宗
- Palace portrait on a hanging scroll, kept in the National Palace Museum, Taipei, Taiwan

Emperor of the Song dynasty
- Reign: 18 February 1189 – 24 July 1194 (Note: Dates given here are in the Julian calendar. They are not in the proleptic Gregorian calendar.)
- Coronation: 18 February 1189
- Predecessor: Emperor Xiaozong
- Successor: Emperor Ningzong
- Born: Zhao Dun (趙惇); 30 September 1147
- Died: 17 September 1200 (aged 52)
- Burial: Yongchong Mausoleum (永崇陵, in present-day Shaoxing, Zhejiang)
- Consorts: Empress Ciyi (died 1200)
- Issue Detail: Emperor Ningzong
Era dates
- Shaoxi (紹熙; 1190–1194)
Posthumous name
- Emperor Xundao Xianren Minggong Maode Wenwen Shunwu Shengzhe Cixiao (循道憲仁明功茂德溫文順武聖哲慈孝皇帝)
Temple name
- Guangzong (光宗)
- House: Zhao
- Dynasty: Song (Southern Song)
- Father: Emperor Xiaozong
- Mother: Empress Chengmu

Emperor Guangzong of Song
- Chinese: 宋光宗
- Literal meaning: "Bright Ancestor of the Song"
Transcriptions
Standard Mandarin
- Hanyu Pinyin: Sòng Guāngzōng
- Wade–Giles: Sung Kuangtsung
- IPA: [sʊ̂ŋ kwáŋ.tsʊ́ŋ]

Zhao Dun
- Traditional Chinese: 趙惇
- Simplified Chinese: 赵惇
Transcriptions
Standard Mandarin
- Hanyu Pinyin: Zhào Dūn
- Wade–Giles: Chao Tun
- IPA: [ʈʂâʊ twə́n]

Emperor Guangzong of Song (30 September 1147 – 17 September 1200), personal name Zhao Dun, was the 12th emperor of the Song dynasty of China and the third emperor of the Southern Song dynasty.

He was the third son of his predecessor, Emperor Xiaozong. His mother was Emperor Xiaozong's first wife, Lady Guo (郭氏; 1126–1156), who was posthumously honoured as "Empress Chengmu" (成穆皇后). His reign was relatively peaceful, but his lack of filial piety eventually made officials replace him with his son Emperor Ningzong.

== Early life ==
During his childhood, Guangzong either suffered from bipolar or severe neurosis. Despite this, Guangzong was reportedly filial to his father even though his father kept on delaying the succession.

In 1184, he was promoted from the ruler of a Zhou to Fu.

Emperor Xiaozong abdicated in favor of his son Emperor Guangzong in 1189, which Emperor Guangzong later described his crowning as king or heir apparent as a "double celebration", which gave the city of Chongqing its present-day name in honour of Guangzong.

== Reign ==
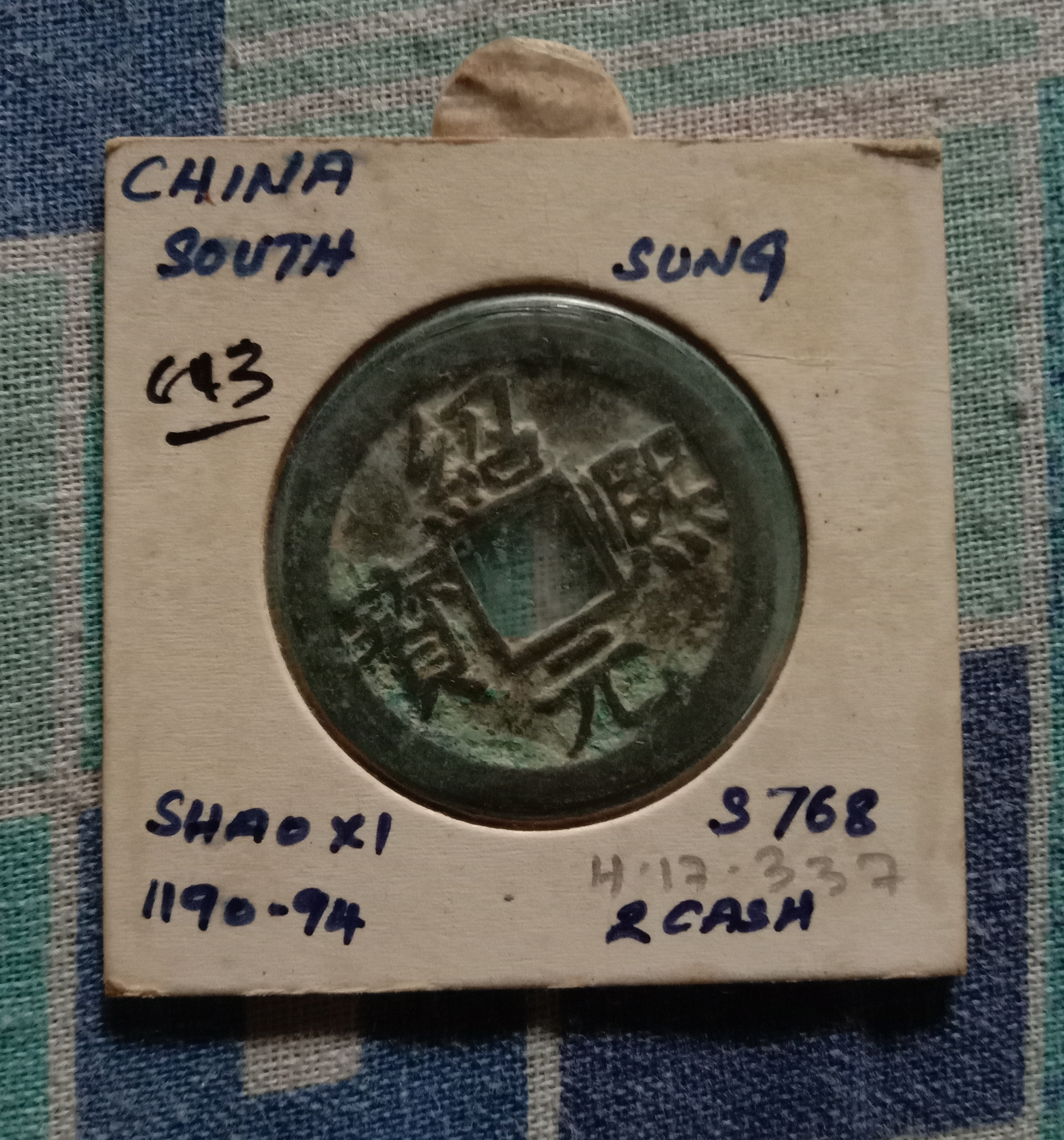
Chinese 2 Cash coin from the Southern Song dynasty, struck during the reign of Guangzong.

Upon the succession of Emperor Guangzong in 1189, it was actually suggested that Empress Dowager Wu would act as his regent, because of his poor health. However, during his reign, it was the spouse of Guangzong who de facto ruled the Song Empire.

Guangzong constantly accompanied his father in tours and banquets. This changed due to the enormous influence of his wife Empress Li Fengniang became notorious in Chinese history for being ruthless and shrewd, and for ruling the state through her husband, who became known a "henpecked weakling" dominated by his wife. Eventually, Guangzong made up excuses in order to avoid his father.

According to Xu Wei, the Nanxi style of theatre began in Emperor Guangzong's reign. Guangzong listened to some treacherous officials and dismissed the popular military leader Xin Qiji. Furthermore, Guangzong gave into drinking in his middle years which deteriorated his mental state.

When the Retired Emperor Xiaozong became sick, Guangzong refused to visit him, upsetting Xiaozong and making Xiaozong's illness worsen.

He was forced to give up his throne to Zhao Kuo, his only surviving son and child in 1194 by his officials and his grandmother, Grand Empress Dowager Wu under the reason that he was "too ill" to perform the mourning rites. In reality, they had forced him to abdicate because he refused to attend the funeral procession of his father, Emperor Xiaozong due to the influence of his wife Empress Li Fengniang, and that he refused to wear mourning clothes making the officials angry about his lack of filial piety. He died in 1200 near Shaoxing, Zhejiang possibly from melancholy as he was mentally ill or he became sick and died.

== Family ==
- Empress Ciyi, of the Li clan (慈懿皇后 李氏; 1144–1200), personal name Fengniang (鳳娘)
  - Zhao Ting (趙挺), first son
  - Zhao Kuo, Ningzong (寧宗 趙擴; 1168–1224), second son
  - Princess Qi'an (齊安公主), third daughter
- Noble Consort, of the Huang clan (貴妃 黃氏 d. 14 December 1191)
  - unborn child (d.1191)
- Noble Consort, of the Zhang clan (贵妃 张氏)
- Jieyu, of the Fu clan (婕妤 符氏)
- Unknown
  - Princess Wen'an (文安公主), first daughter
  - Princess Hezheng (和政公主), second daughter

== See also ==
- Chinese emperors family tree (middle)
- List of emperors of the Song dynasty
- Architecture of the Song dynasty
- Culture of the Song dynasty
- Economy of the Song dynasty
- History of the Song dynasty
- Society of the Song dynasty
- Technology of the Song dynasty
- Jin–Song Wars

Emperor Guangzong of Song House of Zhao Born: 1147 Died: 1200
Regnal titles
Preceded by Emperor Xiaozong	Emperor of the Song Dynasty; 1189–1194	Succeeded by Emperor Ningzong
