= Li Fengniang =

Empress Ciyi 慈懿皇后

Empress consort of the Southern Song dynasty
- Tenure: 18 February 1189 – 24 July 1194
- Predecessor: Empress Chengsu
- Successor: Empress Gongshu

Empress dowager of the Southern Song dynasty
- Tenure: 24 July 1194 – 16 July 1200
- Born: 1144
- Died: 16 July 1200 (aged c. 56); Lin'an, Zhejiang, Song China
- Spouse: Emperor Guangzong
- Issue: Zhao Kuo
Posthumous name
- Empress Ciyi (慈懿皇后)
- Father: Li Dao
- Mother: Lady Zhang

Li Fengniang (1144 – 16 July 1200), posthumously honored as Empress Ciyi, was a Chinese empress consort of the Song dynasty, married to the Emperor Guangzong of Song. She was as the de facto ruler of the Song dynasty during the reign of her spouse.

== Life ==
Empress Li was born as Fengniang, daughter of general Li Dao, a military commissioner from Anyang. According to legend, a Daoist priest and matchmaker one day predicted that she was destined to be the mother of the people. After having made the prediction, the priest asked for an audience with the emperor, and successfully negotiated for her to be accepted as consort of the emperor's grandson Zhao Dun, the future Emperor Guangzong.

== As crown princess ==
Li was accepted as the consort of Prince Dun, and became Crown Princess when her spouse was elevated to the position of heir to the throne in 1170. Crown Princess Li was described as dominant and independent minded. She complained of the concubines of her husband to the retired Emperor Gaozong as well as to her father-in-law Emperor Xiaozong who became displeased with her and asked her to act in a more submissive way, such as the Empress Dowager Wu. Li refused to submit, however, and there are several stories illustrating how she came to dominate her husband.

== As empress consort ==
In 1189, her spouse succeeded to the throne as Emperor Guangzong of Song. Empress Li Fengniang became notorious in Chinese history for being ruthless and shrewd, and for ruling the state through her husband, who became known a "henpecked weakling" dominated by his wife. During his reign, it was the Empress who de facto ruled the Song Empire. There is a legend to how this occurred. In 1191, Empress Li allegedly had the emperor's favorite concubine consort Huang killed, which caused the Emperor to react so badly that he became sick and bedridden, leaving the empress to handle the affairs of state by herself.

Empress Li reportedly attempted to keep the emperor and his father separate, and often stopped the emperor from seeing his father. On one occasion, at the sickbed of the emperor, her father-in-law threatened to have her executed for not taking proper care of the monarch. When her spouse recovered, she told him about the threat, and also that she suspected that the medicine his father had left him was poisoned. This is given as the reason to why Emperor Guangzong did not visit his own father's funeral in 1194, which was blamed on Empress Li and led the Empress Dowager Wu to force Guangzong to abdicate.

== As retired empress ==
After the abdication of her spouse, she was called "The Empress of the Retired Emperor". In 1197, she caused a last scandal by refusing to attend the funeral of Empress Dowager Wu.

== Notes ==
Chinese royalty
Preceded by Empress Chengsu	Empress of China; 1189–1194	Succeeded by Empress Gongshu
