= Emperor Ningzong =

Emperor of Song China from 1194 to 1224

Emperor Ningzong of Song 宋寧宗
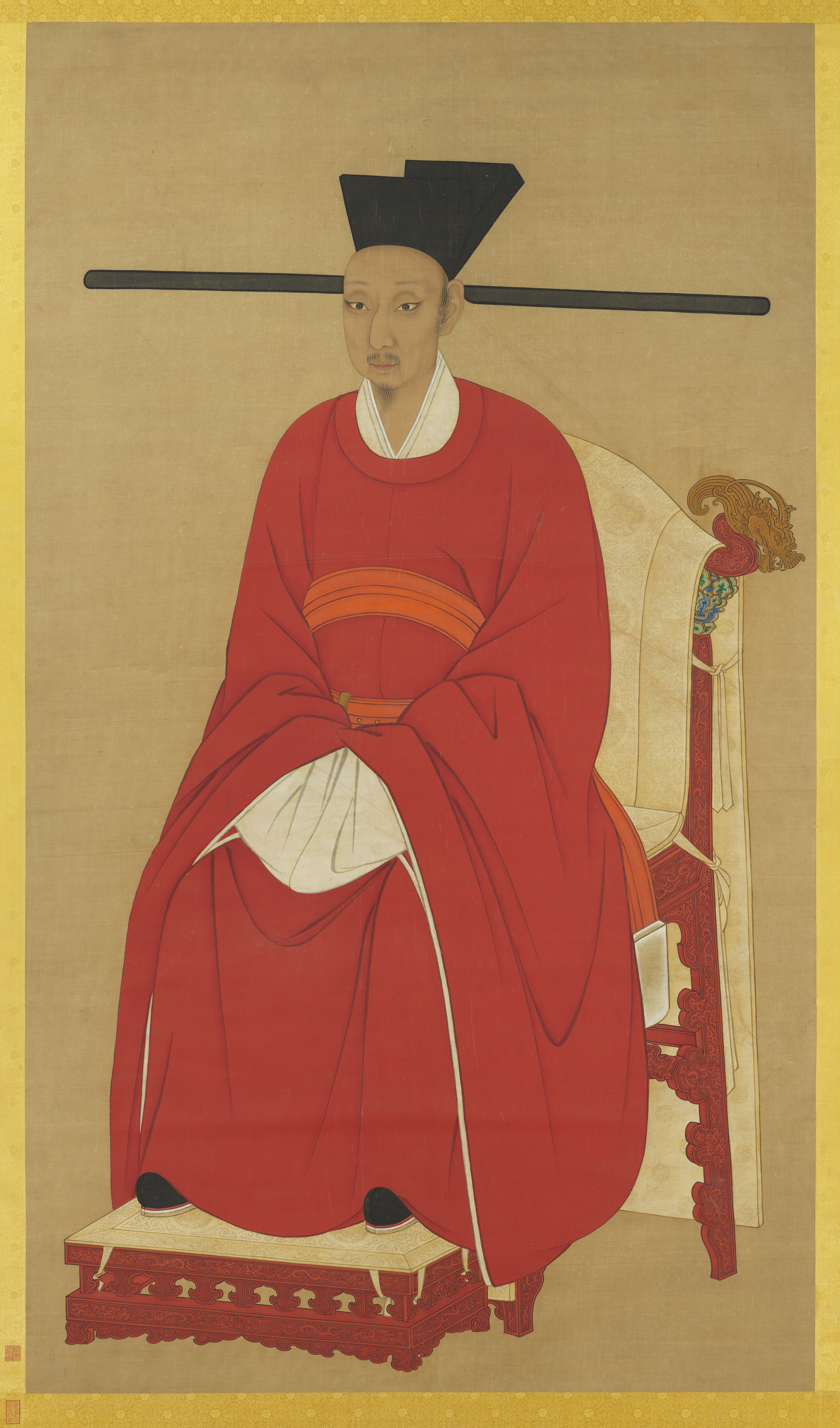
- Palace portrait on a hanging scroll, kept in the National Palace Museum, Taipei, Taiwan

Emperor of the Song dynasty
- Reign: 24 July 1194 – 17 September 1224
- Coronation: 24 July 1194
- Predecessor: Emperor Guangzong
- Successor: Emperor Lizong
- Born: Zhao Kuo (趙擴); 19 November 1168
- Died: 17 September 1224 (aged 55)
- Burial: Yongmao Mausoleum (永茂陵, in present-day Shaoxing, Zhejiang)
- Consorts: Empress Gongshu (m. 1185; died 1200) Empress Gongsheng (m. 1195–1224)
- Issue Detail: Zhao Hong (adopted); Emperor Lizong (adopted)
Era dates
- Qingyuan (慶元; 1195–1201); Jiatai (嘉泰; 1201–1204); Kaixi (開禧; 1205–1207); Jiading (嘉定; 1207–1224)
Posthumous name
- Emperor Fatian Beidao Chunde Maogong Renwen Zhewu Shengrui Gongxiao (法天備道純德茂功仁文哲武聖睿恭孝皇帝)
Temple name
- Ningzong (寧宗)
- House: Zhao
- Dynasty: Song (Southern Song)
- Father: Emperor Guangzong
- Mother: Empress Ciyi

Emperor Ningzong of Song
- Traditional Chinese: 宋寧宗
- Simplified Chinese: 宋宁宗
- Literal meaning: "Peaceful Ancestor of the Song"
Transcriptions
Standard Mandarin
- Hanyu Pinyin: Sòng Níngzōng
- Wade–Giles: Song Ningtsung
- IPA: [sʊ̂ŋ nǐŋ.tsʊ́ŋ]

Zhao Kuo
- Traditional Chinese: 趙擴
- Simplified Chinese: 赵扩
Transcriptions
Standard Mandarin
- Hanyu Pinyin: Zhào Kuo
- Wade–Giles: Chao K'uo
- IPA: [ʈʂâʊ kʰwô]

Emperor Ningzong of Song (19 November 1168 – 17 September 1224), personal name Zhao Kuo, was the 13th emperor of the Song dynasty of China and the fourth emperor of the Southern Song dynasty. He reigned from 1194 until his death in 1224.

He was the second son and the only surviving child of his predecessor Guangzong and like his father, Ningzong was weak-minded; easily dominated by women. During Ningzong's reign, he had built 75 commemorative shrines and steles, the most in Song history. He was a great patron of art, promoting artists such as Liang Kai and Ma Yuan to painter-in-waiting and writing poems about their paintings. Upon Ningzong's death, a minor official and a remote relative of Ningzong became Emperor Lizong.

== Reign ==
He was noted for the cultural and intellectual achievements made during his reign. In particular, Zhu Xi wrote some of his most famous Neo-Confucianist works during this period. However, Emperor Ningzong was known for his aversion towards the spread of Neo-Confucianism in his imperial court due to the influence of his chancellor Han Tuozhou and on the political side, however, Emperor Ningzong saw his government being plagued by rising inflation that threatened the economy and the military advances by the Jurchens from the north during the wars between the Song dynasty and Jurchen-led Jin dynasty.

In absence of a son, he adopted a relative named Zhao Xun in 1197 who was only 6 years old.

In 1198, Neo-Confucianism was banned for two years until the ban was repelled in 1202.

== Song Invasion of Jin ==
As the Jin were weakening because of natural disasters, Ningzong's chancellor Han Tuozhou continually provoked the weak Jin by launching raids. War against the Jin was officially declared on June 14, 1206, by Han Tuozhou. The war was a disaster. Despite the Jin's weakness due to the natural disasters, it repulsed the Song attacks and even counter-attacked. To make things worse, Ningzong was not interested in the war effort and morale was low. There was not enough supplies and many of the army deserted. Wu Xi (吳曦; d. 1207), the governor-general of Sichuan, defected to the Jin in December 1206. This was bad, as Wu was holding the western front, however, Song loyalists assassinated Wu on March 29, 1207, before Jin troops could take control of the surrendered territories. Fighting continued in 1207, but by the end of that year the war was at a stalemate. The Song was now on the defensive, while the Jin failed to make gains in Song territory. The failure of Han Tuozhou's aggressive policies led to his demise. On December 15, 1207, Han was beaten to death by the Imperial Palace Guards.

== Peace ==
A peace treaty was signed on November 2, 1208, and the Song tribute to the Jin was reinstated. The Song annual indemnity increased by 50,000 taels of silver and 50,000 packs of fabric. The treaty also stipulated that the Song had to present to the Jin the head of Han Tuozhou, who the Jin held responsible for starting the war. The heads of Han and Su were severed from their exhumed corpses, exhibited to the public, then delivered to the Jin finally ending the war.

In 1210, the Mongols, formerly a Jin tributary, ended their vassalage and attacked the Jin in 1211. In light of this event, the Song court debated ending tributary payments to the weakened Jin, but they chose to avoid antagonizing the Jin. As the Mongols expanded, the Jin suffered territorial losses and attacked the Song in 1217 to compensate for their shrinking territory. The Jin continued attacking the Song until they agreed to a peace treaty and the Jin returned home. However, the Song would never regain their lost land.

In 1220, Emperor Ningzong's adopted heir Zhao Xun died from dysentery. Zhao Xun was only 29 years old. Shi Miyuan decided when Ningzong died, another relative named Zhao Hong was to succeed him but Zhao Hong was never placed as heir-apparent due to conflicts with Shi Miyuan and when Ningzong died, he was replaced by Zhao Yun, the future Emperor Lizong.

Emperor Ningzong fell ill before dying a few days later in 1224. Ningzong may have been poisoned. It is also worth mentioning that Ningzong was physically weak: his official portrait showing him as nearly emaciated, suggesting physical ailments of some gravity. He was succeeded by another relative named Zhao Yun as all of Ningzong's children died young.

== Criticism on fiscal policy ==
Ye Shi criticized the taxation system during the reign of Emperor Ningzong as a "ruthless extortion". He stated:

Since the government crossed the Yangtze River, taxes have been double what they were in the Xuanhe period. Never in history has government spending been as huge as it is today.

— Ye Shi, Essays: Financial Affairs

Ye Shi pushed for fiscal conservatism, while many Confucian moralists supported fiscal expansion.

== Family ==
- Empress Gongshu, of the Han clan (恭淑皇后 韓氏; 1165–1200)
  - Zhao Jun, Prince Chonghui of Yan (兗衝惠王 趙埈; 1196), second son
  - Zhao Tan, Prince of Bin (邠王 趙坦; 1200), third son
- Empress Gongsheng, of the Yang clan (恭聖皇后 楊氏; 1162–1233), personal name Guizhi (桂枝)
  - Zhao Zeng, Prince of Ying (郢王 趙增; 1200–1201), fourth son
  - Zhao Jiong, Prince of Hua (華王 趙埛; 1202), fifth son
- Jieyu, of the Cao clan (婕妤 曹氏)
  - Princess Yuping (玉屏公主)
    - Married Lin Cun (林存)
- Furen, of the Zhong clan (夫人 鍾氏)
  - Zhao Qi, Prince of Shun (順王 趙圻; 1207), sixth son
  - Zhao Zhi, Prince of Shen (申王 趙墌; 1207), seventh son
- Unknown
  - Zhao Ji, Prince of Su (肅王 趙垍; 1208), eighth son
  - Zhao Zhi, Prince of Pi (邳王 趙坻; 1223), ninth son
  - Princess Qi (祁公主), first daughter

Adopted Issue:

- Zhao Xun, Crown Prince Jingxian (景獻皇太子 趙詢; 1192–1220)
- Zhao Hong, Prince Zhaosu of Zhen (鎮昭肅王 趙竤; d. 1225)
- Zhao Yun, Lizong (理宗 趙昀; 1205–1264)

== See also ==
- Chinese emperors family tree (middle)
- List of emperors of the Song dynasty
- Architecture of the Song dynasty
- Culture of the Song dynasty
- Economy of the Song dynasty
- History of the Song dynasty
- Society of the Song dynasty
- Technology of the Song dynasty

Emperor Ningzong House of Zhao Born: 1168 Died: 1224
Regnal titles
Preceded by Emperor Guangzong	Emperor of the Song dynasty 1194–1224	Succeeded by Emperor Lizong
