= Emperor Xiaozong of Song =

Chinese Song dynasty emperor from 1162 to 1189

Emperor Xiaozong of Song 宋孝宗
- Palace portrait on a hanging scroll, kept in the National Palace Museum, Taipei, Taiwan

Emperor of the Song dynasty
- Reign: 24 July 1162 – 18 February 1189
- Coronation: 24 July 1162
- Predecessor: Emperor Gaozong
- Successor: Emperor Guangzong

Retired Emperor of the Song dynasty
- Reign: 18 February 1189 – 28 June 1194
- Born: 27 November 1127; Jiaxing County, Xiuzhou, Song dynasty (modern Jiaxing, Zhejiang, China)
- Died: 28 June 1194 (aged 66); Lin'an, Song dynasty (modern Hangzhou, Zhejiang)
- Burial: Yongfu Mausoleum (永阜陵, in present-day Shaoxing, Zhejiang)
- Consorts: Empress Chengmu (died 1156) Empress Chenggong (died 1167) Empress Chengsu (before 1194)
- Issue Detail: Emperor Guangzong
Names
- Zhao Bocong (1127–1133); Zhao Yuan (1133–1160); Zhao Wei (1160–1162); Zhao Shen (1162–1194)
Era dates
- Longxing (隆興; 1163–1164); Qiandao (乾道; 1165–1173); Chunxi (淳熙; 1174–1189)
Posthumous name
- Emperor Shaotong Tongdao Guande Zhaogong Zhewen Shenwu Mingsheng Chengxiao (紹統同道冠德昭功哲文神武明聖成孝皇帝) (conferred in 1197)
Temple name
- Xiaozong (孝宗)
- House: Zhao
- Dynasty: Song (Southern Song)
- Father: Zhao Zicheng; Emperor Gaozong (adoptive father)
- Mother: Lady Zhang

Emperor Xiaozong of Song
- Chinese: 宋孝宗
- Literal meaning: "Filial Ancestor of the Song"
Transcriptions
Standard Mandarin
- Hanyu Pinyin: Sòng Xiàozōng

Zhao Shen
- Traditional Chinese: 趙昚
- Simplified Chinese: 赵昚
Transcriptions
Standard Mandarin
- Hanyu Pinyin: Zhào Shèn

Yuanyong (courtesy name)
- Chinese: 元永
Transcriptions
Standard Mandarin
- Hanyu Pinyin: Yuányǒng

Emperor Xiaozong of Song (27 November 1127 – 28 June 1194), personal name Zhao Shen, courtesy name Yuanyong, was the 11th emperor of the Song dynasty of China and the second emperor of the Southern Song dynasty. He started his reign in 1162 when his adoptive father and predecessor, Emperor Gaozong, abdicated and passed the throne to him. Even though Emperor Gaozong became a Taishang Huang ("Retired Emperor") after his abdication, he remained the de facto ruler, so Emperor Xiaozong only took full power in 1187 after Emperor Gaozong's death. After ruling for about a year, Emperor Xiaozong followed in his predecessor's footsteps and abdicated in favour of his third son Zhao Dun (Emperor Guangzong), while he became Taishang Huang and still remained in power until his death in 1194.

He was the first descendant of Emperor Taizu to become emperor and remembered as an effective ruler as the Song enjoyed prosperity during his reign.

== Names ==
Zhao Shen's birth name was Zhao Bocong (趙伯琮). In March 1133, after Zhao Bocong entered the imperial palace, his name was changed to Zhao Yuan (趙瑗). In April 1160, after Zhao Yuan was adopted by Emperor Gaozong, his name was changed to Zhao Wei (趙瑋). In July 1162, when Zhao Wei became crown prince, his name was changed again to Zhao Shen (趙眘).

Zhao Shen was given the courtesy name Yuangui (元瑰) in May 1160. In July 1162, when he became crown prince, his courtesy name was changed to Yuanyong (元永).

== Early life ==
Zhao Shen was a seventh-generation descendant of Emperor Taizu, the founder and first emperor of the Song dynasty. He was the second son of Zhao Zicheng (趙子偁; died 1143), a sixth cousin of Emperor Gaozong, the 10th Song emperor. After the Jingkang Incident in 1127, Emperor Gaozong's father, eldest brother and most of his close relatives were taken prisoner by the Jurchen-led Jin Empire. As Emperor Gaozong's only son, Zhao Fu, died prematurely around the age of two, the emperor ordered his officials to start searching for other living descendants of the imperial family. Zhao Shen was discovered and adopted by Emperor Gaozong in April 1160 as a son. Another relative, Zhao Qu was also adopted. In July 1162, Emperor Gaozong officially designated Zhao Shen as his crown prince and heir apparent. One of the main reasons Gaozong chose Shen over Qu was of Shen's virtue. It is said that Gaozong gave ten maids to Shen and Qu. In the end, Qu had touched every maid but Shen had not even touched one winning Gaozong's favor over Qu.

In 24 July 1162, Emperor Gaozong abdicated in favor of Emperor Xiaozong who became emperor although Emperor Gaozong retained power as Taishang Huang.

== Reign ==
During the reign of Emperor Xiaozong, the Chinese increased the number of trade missions that would dock at ports throughout the Indian Ocean, where Arab and Hindu influence was once predominant. Xiaozong also was responsible for Yue Fei's posthumous rehabilitation, clearing out the remnants of Qin Hui's faction in court, and stabilizing the economy making his reign the most powerful era of the Southern Song Dynasty and it is said he was the best ruler of the Southern Song dynasty.

Xiaozong's reign was one of the few times in Southern Song that was not dominated by powerful officials, as he held power supreme and unchallenged. He was also a demanding emperor who frequently dismissed ministers without hesitation if they failed to meet his expectations. This led to many criticisms of the emperors personnel policy. In 1166, the lesser lord of agricultural supervision, Mo Chi remonstrated to the emperor, criticizing him for dismissing councilors and other officials only having served for a few months. The emperor commended Mo Chi for his criticism, but ignored it. One of the reasons behind Xiaozongs policy could have been to avoid the amassing of great power in the person of individual officials, such as the great power wielded by Qin Gui in Gaozong's era, with a convenient way in achieving this to limit ministerial tenure of office so they could not build a base in court.

The Emperor also controlled his ministers by curtailing their authority. Early in 1167 the Emperor finally filled every vacancy in the Council of State by appointing chief councilors of the left and right and two assistant councilors. The bureaucracy was generally pleased with the appointments, but the remarks of the vice-minister for war, Chen Yanxiao, contained both jubilations over the appointments but skepticism over the reduced powers of the councilors. Although Xiaozong is said to have listened to Chen, he never put his advice into practice. Throughout the Xiaozong reign the chief complaint of officials was his is tendency to infringe on their authority. Xiaozong in principle realized the importance of treating his councilors with dignity and granting them executive authority, however in reality his participation in all major decisions greatly limited their authority. In 1163 chief councilors were appointed to positions of Commissioners of military affairs, and in 1167 they were also granted financial authority with the titles of controller of national finance (Zhi Guoyongshi). Later in Southern Song this contributed to the power of the chief councilors, however during Xiaozongs reign this was not the case. Xiaozong intended for his ministers to exercise their powers in ordinary administrative affairs, however the emperor was in the habit of guarding his imperial prerogatives and frequently exercised them especially in military matters. As in 1167 when Imperial orders issued to the Bureau of Military affairs bypassed the Secretariat and Imperial Councilors and went straight to the Imperial Chancellery. After requests to the Emperor that orders go through regular bureaucratic streams he promised to rectify this, but instead he continued to issue direct dispatches as "confidential orders" (mi-pai). Xiaozong began to directly issue palace orders (nei-pi) and imperial decrees (yu-pi) without prior consultation with councilors to enhance his power in other areas.

According to Dieter Kuhn, Emperor Xiaozong "is said to have spent ten sleepless years after issuing huizi" and was the main driving power behind attempts to stabilize the monetary system. In 1166 the Emperor bought back two million silver ounces worth of circulating huizi and had them burned, as well as decreeing that paper notes could be accepted for payment of taxes and fees. Xiaozong in these policies tried to regulate the market value of paper currency by limiting the quantity in circulation. These policies to curb inflation proved effective, and in 1175 he managed to stabilize the value of huizi. In 1178 Huang Chouruo stated in a report to the throne: “If [huizi] are few, they are expensive, if there are many, they are cheap.” In 1186 there were around 20 million strings of cash in issue. He closely supervised the court and central government to make sure power remained balance among high officials and tried in earnest to live up to Confucian standards of moral behavior.

Archery and equestrianism were required for non-military officials at the Military College in 1162 during Emperor Xiaozong's reign.

In 1165, he reached peace with the Jin Dynasty.

In the Southern Song years, revenue from state monopolies on tea, salt, and jiu, along with commercial taxes, was crucial to the state's finances and was increasing. During Emperor Xiaozong's late Chunxi period, summer and autumn agricultural land taxes dropped to 20.4 percent and 15.3 percent of total revenue of the government compared from the reign of Emperor Shenzong.

In 1187, the retired Emperor Gaozong died. Xiaozong was stricken with grief and retreated from governing, insisting on mourning Gaozong and stating that he would only rule for two more years. Xiaozong turned all government affairs to his son Zhao Dun.

In 1189, Emperor Xiaozong abdicated in favour of his son, Zhao Dun who took the throne as Emperor Guangzong. He then granted himself the title Taishang Huang and remained as the de facto ruler. Xiaozong is also said to have been suffering from mental illness in the last two years of his reign, which encouraged him to follow the example of his stepfather Gaozong and retire.

== As Retired Emperor ==
His daughter-in-law Empress Li reportedly attempted to keep Emperor Guangzong and his father (Xiaozong) separate, and often stopped the emperor from seeing his father. On one occasion, at the sickbed of the emperor, her father-in-law threatened to have her executed for not taking proper care of the monarch.

Retired Emperor Xiaozong fell ill in 1194 and was made worse when Emperor Guangzong refused to visit him. Xiaozong soon died. Emperor Guangzong refused to attend his funeral and as a result, was forced to give his throne to the deceased retired emperor's grandson Emperor Ningzong.

== Family ==
- Empress Chengmu, of the Guo clan (成穆皇后 郭氏; 1126–1156)
  - Zhao Qi, Crown Prince Zhuangwen (莊文皇太子 趙愭; 1144–1167), first son
  - Zhao Kai, Prince Huixian of Wei (魏惠憲王 趙愷; 1146–1180), second son
  - Zhao Dun, Guangzong (光宗 趙惇; 1147–1200), third son
  - Zhao Ke, Prince Daosu of Shao (邵悼肅王 趙恪), fourth son
  - Princess Jia (嘉公主; 1149 – 1162), first daughter
- Empress Chenggong, of the Xia clan (成恭皇后 夏氏; d. 1167)
  - Second daughter
  - Fifth son
- Empress Chengsu, of the Xie clan (成肅皇后 謝氏; 1132–1203), personal name Sufang (蘇芳)
- Noble Consort, of the Cai clan (贵妃 蔡氏)
- Worthy Consort, of the Li clan (贤妃 李氏)
  - Third daughter (b. 1182)

== See also ==
1. Chinese emperors family tree (middle)
2. List of emperors of the Song dynasty
3. Architecture of the Song dynasty
4. Culture of the Song dynasty
5. Economy of the Song dynasty
6. History of the Song dynasty
7. Society of the Song dynasty
8. Technology of the Song dynasty
9. Jin–Song Wars

Emperor Xiaozong of Song House of Zhao Born: 1127 Died: 1194
Regnal titles
Preceded by Emperor Gaozong	Emperor of the Song Dynasty; 1162–1189	Succeeded by Emperor Guangzong
