= Mongol conquest of the Song dynasty =

Invasion of China from 1235 to 1279

- Part of Mongol conquest of China and Kublai Khan's campaigns
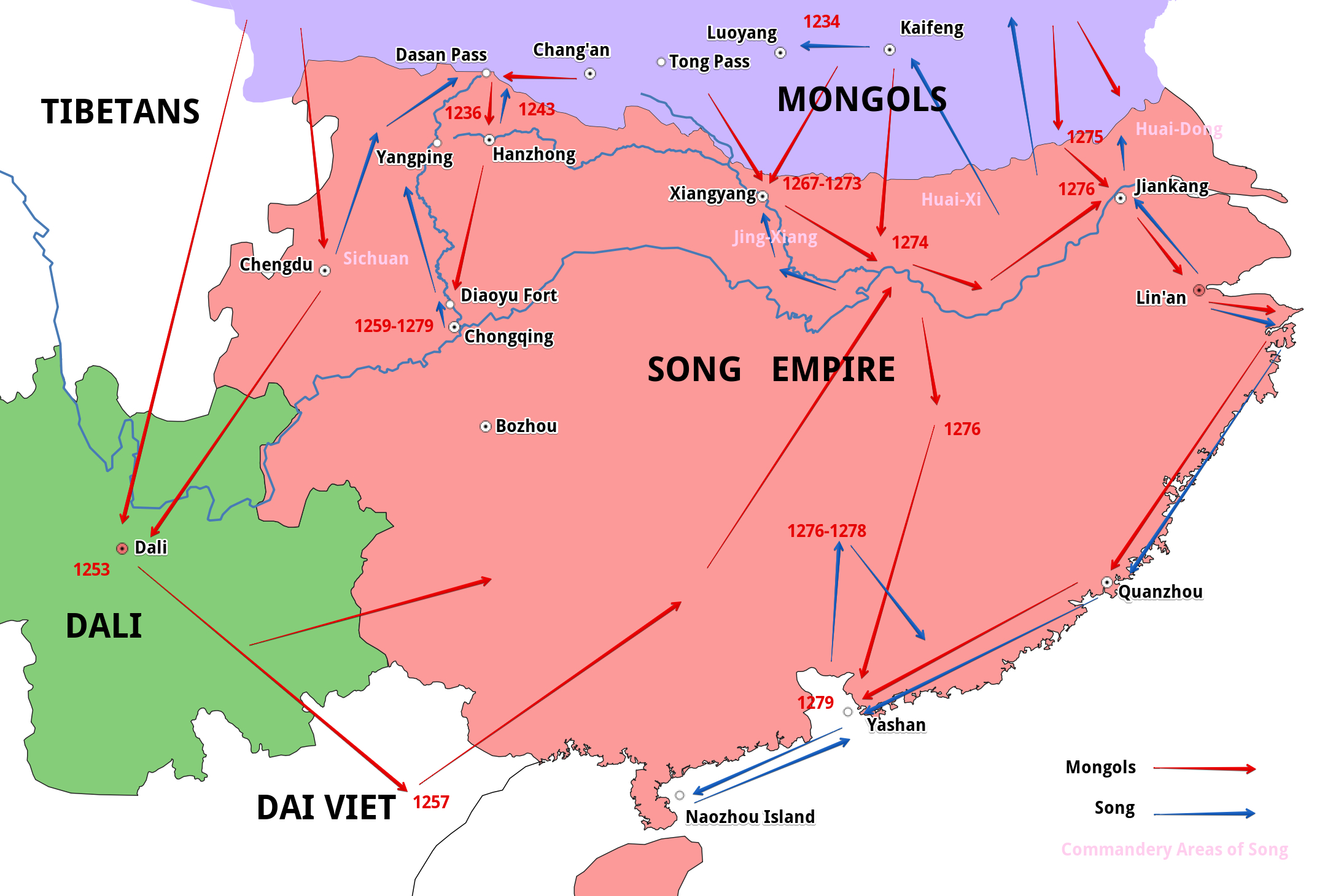
- Mongol invasion of the Southern Song dynasty (1234–1279)
Date	11 February 1235 – 19 March 1279
Location	South China
Result	Yuan victory
Territorial changes	Southern China conquered by the Yuan dynasty

Belligerents
Mongol Empire; Yuan dynasty (from 1260); Dali Kingdom	Song China

Commanders and leaders
Ögedei; Töregene; Güyük; Möngke; Kublai; Bayan; Uriyangkhadai; Aju; Shi Tianze; Zhang Hongfan; Zhang Rou	Emperor Lizong; Emperor Duzong; Emperor Gong; Emperor Duanzong; Emperor Bing †; Jia Sidao; Lü Wenhuan; Cao Youwen; Li Tingzhi (executed); Zhang Shijie (defected); Wen Tianxiang

Strength
Over 600,000 (Note: An initial coalition invasion force of ninety Tumens at roughly two-thirds strength, including Mongols, Chinese, Khitans, Jurchens, Alan Asuds, Turkic people, Central Asians, Cuan-bo Bai people and Yi people from the Kingdom of Dali.)	Unknown

Casualties and losses
- Very heavy

The Mongol conquest of the Song dynasty (or Song–Yuan War) was the final phase of the Mongol conquest of China, beginning under Ögedei Khan (r. 1229–1241) and being completed under Kublai Khan (r. 1260–1294). It is considered the last great military achievement of the Mongol Empire; upon its completion, the Mongols ruled all of continental East Asia under the Han-style Yuan dynasty that had been founded as a division of the Mongol Empire.

== Background ==
Before the Mongol–Jin war escalated, an envoy from the Song dynasty of China arrived at the court of the Mongols, perhaps to negotiate a united offensive against the Jin dynasty, who the Song had previously fought during the Jin–Song wars. While Genghis Khan refused during his life, upon his death in 1227 he bequeathed a plan to attack the Jin capital by passing through Song territory. Subsequently, a Mongol ambassador was killed by the Song governor in uncertain circumstances. Before receiving any explanation, the Mongols marched through Song territory to enter the Jin's redoubt in Henan.

=== The 1227 incident ===
Emperor Lizong of Song

In the early spring of 1227, Genghis Khan ordered a small fraction of the army to advance into the Song Lizhou Circuit, in the name of attacking Jin and Western Xia. The five prefectures of Jie, Feng, Chen, He and Tianshui were ravaged. Then the Mongols moved southward and seized Wenzhou. In July, the Mongols returned to the north. Genghis Khan further realized that to destroy the Jin dynasty the Mongol army must make its way via the Song. The 1227 incident (Chinese: 丁亥之變) was the first armed conflict between the Mongols and the Song, but it was incidental to the Mongol conflict with the Jin.

=== Battles of Shukou ===
From the winter of 1230 to the autumn of 1231, the Mongols forcibly passed through regions of the Song. In the region centered on the three passes of Shukou (Chinese: 蜀口), they entered into a series of battles with the Song army. This was the second and largest armed conflict between them before the Mongol conquest of Song officially began.

=== After the conquest of Jin ===
In 1233, the Song finally became allies with the Mongols, who agreed to share territories south of the Yellow River with the Song. Song general Meng Gong defeated Jin general Wu Xian and directed his troops to besiege Caizhou, to which the last Jin emperor had fled. With the help of the Mongols, the Song armies were finally able to extinguish the Jin that had occupied northern China for more than a century. A year later, the Song generals fielded their armies to occupy the old capitals of the Song. They advanced as far as Kaifeng but were completely repelled by the Mongol garrisons under Tachir, a descendant of Bo'orchu, who was a famed companion of Genghis Khan.

Mongol forces, headed by Genghis's son Ögedei Khan, began a slow, steady invasion of the south. Song resistance was fierce, resulting in a prolonged series of campaigns; however, the primary obstacles to the prosecution of the Mongol campaigns was unfamiliar terrain that was inhospitable to their horses, new diseases, and the need to wage naval battles, a form of warfare completely alien to the masters of the steppe. This combination resulted in one of the most difficult and prolonged wars of the Mongol conquests. The Chinese offered the fiercest resistance among all people that the Mongols fought, and the Mongols required every single advantage they could gain and "every military artifice known at that time" in order to win.

More stubborn resistance was put up by Korea and Song towards the Mongol invasions than the others in Eurasia who were swiftly crushed by the Mongols at a lightning pace. The Mongol force that invaded southern China was far greater than the force they sent to invade the Middle East in 1256.

== First stage (1235–1248) ==
From 1235 on, the Mongol general Köden started to attack the region of Sichuan through the Chengdu plain. The occupation of this region had often been an important step for the conquest of the south. The important city of Xiangyang, the gateway to the Yangtze plain, which was defended by the Song general Cao Youwen, capitulated in 1236. In the east, meanwhile, Song generals like Meng Gong (孟珙) and Du Gao (杜杲) withstood the pressure of the Mongol armies under Kouwen Buhua because the main Mongol forces were at that time moving towards Europe. In Sichuan, governor Yu Jie adopted the plan of the brothers Ran Jin and Ran Pu to fortify important locations in mountainous areas, like Diaoyucheng (modern Hechuan/Sichuan). From this point, Yu Jie was able to hold Sichuan for a further ten years. In 1239, General Meng Gong defeated the Mongols and retook Xiangyang, contesting Sichuan against the Mongols for years. The only permanent gain was Chengdu for the Mongols in 1241. In the Huai River area, the Mongol Empire's commanders remained on the defensive, taking few major Song cities, although Töregene Khatun and Güyük Khan ordered their generals to attack the Song.

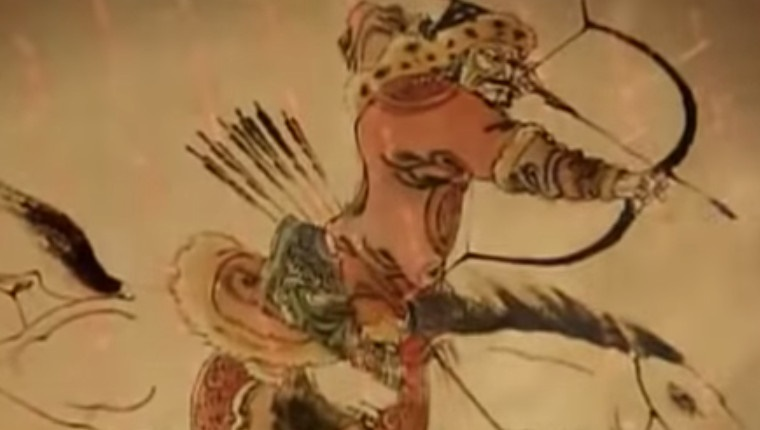
Mongol warrior on horseback, preparing a mounted archery shot.

Many Han Chinese defected to the Mongols to fight against the Jin. There were 4 Han Chinese tumens, with each tumen consisting of 10,000 troops. The four Han Chinese generals Zhang Rou, Yan Shi, Shi Tianze, and Liu Heima commanded the four Han Chinese tumens under Ögedei Khan.

The conflicts between the Mongols and the Song troops took place in the area of Chengdu. When Töregene Khatun sent her envoys to negotiate peace, the Song imprisoned them. The Mongols invaded Sichuan in 1242. Their commanders ordered Han Chinese tumen general Zhang Rou and Chagaan (Tsagaan) to attack the Song. When they pillaged Song territory, the Song court sent a delegation to negotiate a ceasefire. Chagaan and Zhang Rou returned north after the Mongols accepted the terms.

The Mongols made heavy use of indigenous ethnic minority soldiers in southern China rather than Mongols. The Dali Kingdom's indigenous Cuan-Bo army led by the Duan royal family were the majority of the forces in the Mongol Yuan army sent to attack the Song during battles along the Yangtze River. During a Mongol attack against the Song, there were only 3,000 Mongol cavalry at one point under the Mongol commander Uriyangkhadai, and the majority of his army were native Cuan-Bo with Duan officers.

An account of the Mongol attack on Nanjing was given in a Chinese annal, describing the Chinese defenders' use of gunpowder against the Mongols:

As the Mongols had dug themselves pits under the earth where they were sheltered from missiles, we decided to bind with iron the machines called zhen tian lei [thunder-shaking-the-sky]... and lowered them into the places

where the translation of the term for the device is that of Prof. Partington, who describes it as an iron pot filled with [huo] yao, literally "fire drug", a low-nitrate gunpowder or proto-gunpowder, sometimes lowered on chains, that sent forth "fire... out of every part", with an incendiary effect over many yards that could pierce metal to which it was attached, producing a "noise like thunder" that could be heard for miles, with the result that "the men and the oxhides were all broken into fragments (chieh sui) flying in all directions".

== Second stage (1251–1260) ==
The Mongol attacks on Southern Song intensified with the election of Möngke as the Great Khan in 1251. Passing through the Chengdu Plain in Sichuan, the Mongols conquered the Kingdom of Dali in modern Yunnan in 1253. The Mongols besieged Ho-chiou and lifted the siege very soon in 1254. Möngke's brother Kublai and general Uriyangkhadai pacified Yunnan and Tibet and invaded the Trần dynasty in Vietnam.

Uriyangkhadai led successful campaigns in the southwest of China and pacified tribes in Tibet before turning east towards Dai Viet by 1257. In the autumn of 1257, Uriyangkhadai addressed three letters to Dai Viet emperor Trần Thái Tông demanding passage through southern China. After the three successive envoys were imprisoned in the capital Thang Long (modern-day Hanoi) of Dai Viet, Uriyangkhadai invaded Dai Viet in December 1257 with generals Trechecdu and Aju in the rear. In October 1257, Möngke had set out for South China and fixed his camps near Mount Liupan in May 1258. Möngke entered Sichuan in 1258 with two-thirds of the Mongol strength.

According to the Đại Việt Sử ký toàn thư, Mongol forces under Uriyangkhadai battled the larger Trần army led by emperor Trần in Bình Lệ steppe (Bạch Hạc) on 17 January 1258, northwest of Thăng Long. On 22 January 1258, Uriyangkhadai successfully captured the Dai Viet capital Thang Long (now known as Hanoi). While Chinese source material incorrectly stated that Uriyangkhadai withdrew from Vietnam after nine days due to poor climate, Uriyangkhadai left Thang Long in 1259 to invade the Song dynasty in modern-day Guangxi as part of a coordinated Mongol attack with armies attacking in Sichuan under Möngke Khan and other Mongol armies attacking in modern-day Shandong and Henan. Around 17 November 1259, Kublai Khan received a messenger while besieging Ezhou in Hubei who described Uriyangkhadai's army advances from Thang Long to Tanzhou (modern-day Changsha) in Hunan via Yongzhou (modern-day Nanning) and Guilin in Guangxi. Uriyangkhada's army subsequently fought its way north to rejoin Kublai Khan's army north of the Yangtze river on their way back to northern China. While conducting the war in China at Diaoyu Fortress in modern-day Chongqing, Möngke died, perhaps of dysentery or cholera or from a defender's projectile, near the site of the siege on 11 August 1259.

The central government of the Southern Song meanwhile was unable to cope with the challenge of the Mongols and new peasant uprisings in the region of modern Fujian led by Yan Mengbiao and Hunan. The court of Emperor Lizong was dominated by consort clans, Yan and Jia, and the eunuchs Dong Songchen and Lu Yunsheng. In 1260, Jia Sidao became chancellor who took control over the new emperor Zhao Qi (posthumous title Song Duzong) and expelled his opponents like Wen Tianxiang and Li Fu. Because the financial revenue of the late Southern Song state was very low, Jia Sidao tried to reform the regulations for the merchandise of lands with his state field law.

Gunpowder weapons like the tuhuo gun (突火槍), which fired bullets from bamboo tubes, were deployed by the Chinese against the Mongol forces.

The Tusi chieftains and local tribe leaders and kingdoms in Yunnan, Guizhou and Sichuan submitted to Yuan rule and were allowed to keep their titles. The Han Chinese Yang family ruling the Chiefdom of Bozhou which was recognized by the Song dynasty and Tang dynasty also received recognition by the Mongols in the Yuan dynasty and later by the Ming dynasty. The Luo clan in Shuixi led by Ahua were recognized by the Yuan emperors, as they were by the Song emperors when led by Pugui and Tang emperors when led by Apei. They descended from the Shu Han era king Huoji who helped Zhuge Liang against Meng Huo. They were also recognized by the Ming dynasty.

== Prelude and surrender of Song (1260–1276) ==
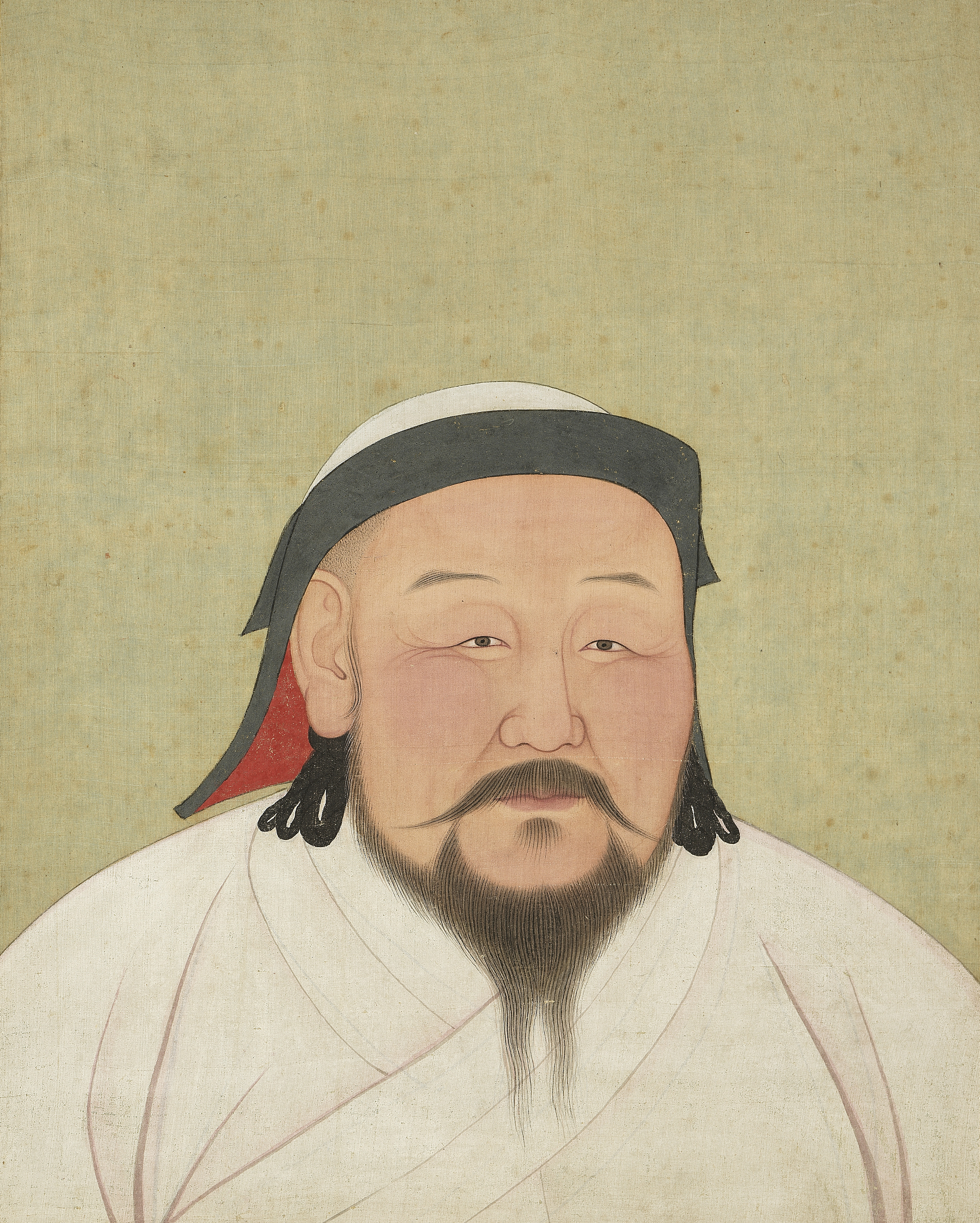
Kublai Khan, the Great Khan of the Mongol Empire and Emperor of the Yuan dynasty. Painting from 1294.

After Kublai was elected Great Khan of the Mongols in 1260, he was eventually able to conquer the Song to the south, but at great cost. From 1260 to 1264, he first faced civil insurrection within the Mongol empire, led by his younger brother, Ariq Böke, who had been left in command of the north and stationed at the Mongol capital, Karakorum. This led to the Toluid Civil War and was followed by a major confrontation at the Diaoyu Fortress in Sichuan in 1265. The Mongols eventually defeated the Song land and naval armies and captured more than 100 ships.

The Yuan dynasty created a "Han Army" (漢軍) out of defected Jin troops and an army of defected Song troops called the "Newly Submitted Army" (新附軍). Southern Song Chinese troops who defected and surrendered to the Mongols were granted Korean women as wives by the Mongols, whom the Mongols earlier took during their invasion of Korea as war booty. The many Song Chinese troops who defected to the Mongols were given oxen, clothes and land. As prizes for battlefield victories, lands sectioned off as appanages were handed by the Yuan dynasty to Chinese military officers who defected to the Mongol side. The Yuan gave defecting Song Chinese soldiers juntun, a type of military farmland.

In 1268, the Mongol advance was halted at the city of Xiangyang, situated on the Han River, which controlled access to the Yangtze, the gateway to the important trading centre of Hangzhou. The walls of Xiangyang were approximately 6 to 7 metres (20 to 23 ft) thick and encompassed an area 5 kilometres (3.1 mi) wide. The main entrances in the wall led out to a waterway impossible to ford in the summer, and impassable as a swamp and a series of ponds and mud flats in the winter. Xiangyang was linked to its twin city, Fancheng (樊城), on the opposite riverbank, by a pontoon bridge spanning the river from where the defenders of the twin settlements attempted to break the siege. However, the Mongols under Aju thwarted every attempt and crushed all reinforcements from the Song, each detachment numbering in the thousands. According to Professor Zhang Lianggao of Huazhong University of Science and Technology, in 1269 (咸淳五年), the Mongols invaded the Yangtze River valley but were repulsed. The Wuying Pagoda was rebuilt in 1270 (咸淳六年) in the throes of the overthrow of the Southern Song during the reign of Emperor Duzong.

After this defeat, Aju asked Kublai for the powerful siege machines of the Ilkhanate. Ismail and Al-aud-Din, from Mosul, Iraq, arrived in South China to construct a new type of counterweight-driven trebuchet that could use explosive shells. The engineers from Mosul built the new siege trebuchets, and smaller mangonels, and traction trebuchets as well. The design of the critical new counterweight trebuchets were taken from those used by Hulagu to batter down the walls of Baghdad in 1258. The counterweight trebuchets Hulagu used (referred to as "Frankish mangonels" in an official Ilkhanate history) were almost certainly borrowed from his Crusader state vassals, having been sent to the Levant by French crusaders by 1242 at the latest. According to the Ilkhanate historian Rashid Al-Din, the introduction of these weapons in 1268 was decisive and allowed the Mongols to rapidly conquer fortified cities they had previously deemed untakeable.

Explosive shells had been in use in China for centuries, but the counterweight system of the trebuchet (as opposed to the torsion-type) gave greater range and accuracy while also making it easier to judge the force generated (versus by the torsion from repeated windings). As such, the counterweight trebuchet built by the Persians were, practically speaking, greater in range, and so could assist in destroying the walls at Fancheng with greater safety to the Mongol forces. The Muslim and additional Chinese engineers operated the artillery and siege engines for the Mongol armies. Hence, the Chinese, who were the first to invent the traction trebuchet, now faced Persian-designed counterweight trebuchets on the side of the Mongol army, so by 1273 the Chinese were led to build their own counterweight trebuchets; as a Chinese account states, "In 1273 the frontier cities had all fallen. But Muslim trebuchets were constructed with new and ingenious improvements, and different kinds became available, far better than those used before."

During the siege, both the Mongol and Song forces used thunder crash bombs, a type of incendiary gunpowder weapon of cast iron, filled with gunpowder and which was delivered via trebuchet or other means. The effects of these shells on men and natural materials was devastating; the noise was thunderous and resounded for many miles, while the bomb's casing could penetrate iron armor during the explosion. The Mongols also utilized siege crossbows, while the Song used fire arrows and fire lances.

Political infighting in the Song also contributed to the fall of Xiangyang and Fancheng, due to the power of the Lü family. Many questioned their allegiance to the Song as morale was collapsing, and the Emperor barred Jia Sidao himself from the command. Li Tingzhi, an enemy of the Lü family, was appointed commander. Jia permitted the Lüs to ignore Li's orders, resulting in a fractious command. Li was then unable to relieve Xiangyang and Fancheng, managing only temporary resupply during several breaks in the siege.

Bayan of the Baarin, the Mongol commander, then sent half of his force up-river to wade to the south bank in order to build a bridge across to take the Yang lo fortress; three thousand Song boats came up the Han river and were repulsed, with fifty boats destroyed and 2,000 dead. In the maritime engagements, the Song forces used paddle ships, and on some ships at least, fire lance, siege crossbows, and incendiary devices were deployed against Mongol forces.

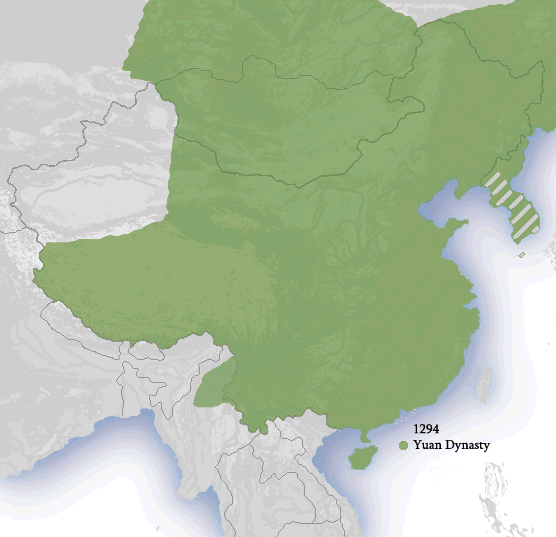
The Yuan dynasty under Kublai Khan after the conquest of Southern Song dynasty.

Xiangyang's commander Lü Wenhuan from the Lü family then surrendered to the Mongol commander and was appointed as governor of Xiangyang. The entire force, now including the yielding commander, sailed down the Yangtze, and the forts along the way surrendered, as this commander – now allied with the Mongols – had also commanded many of the down-river garrisons. Lü Wenhuan persuaded the rest of his family to switch sides. In 1270, Kublai ordered the construction of five thousand ships. Three years later, an additional two thousand ships were ordered built; these would carry about 50,000 troops to give battle to the Song.

In 1273, Fancheng capitulated, the Mongols putting the entire population to death by sword to terrorize the inhabitants of Xiangyang. After the surrender of Xiangyang, several thousand ships were deployed. The Song fleet, despite their deployment as a coastal defense fleet or coast guard more than an operational navy, was more than a match for the Mongols. Under his great general Bayan, Khublai unleashed a riverine attack upon the defended city of Xiangyang on the Han River. The Mongols ultimately prevailed, but only after five more years of struggle.

Kublai had founded the Yuan dynasty in 1271, and by 1273, the Mongols had emerged victorious on the Han River. The Yangtse River was opened for a large fleet that could conquer the Southern Song empire. A year later, the child-prince Zhao Xian was made emperor. Resistance continued, resulting in Bayan's massacre of the inhabitants of Changzhou in 1275 and mass suicide of the defenders at Changsha in January 1276. When the Yuan Mongol-Chinese troops and fleet advanced and one prefecture after the other submitted to the Yuan, Jia Sidao offered his own submission, but the Yuan chancellor Bayan refused.

The last contingents of the Song dynasty were heavily defeated, the old city of Jiankang fell, and Jia Sidao was killed. The capital of Song, Lin'an, was defended by Wen Tianxiang and Zhang Shijie.

When Bayan and Dong Wenbing camped outside Lin'an in February 1276, the Song Grand Empress Dowager Xie and Empress Dowager Quan surrendered the underage Emperor Gong of Song along with the imperial seal.

Historian Patricia Buckley Ebrey notes that the Mongol Yuan dynasty treated the Jurchen Wanyan royal family harshly, butchering them by the hundreds as well as the Tangut emperor of Western Xia when they defeated him earlier. However, Ebrey also notes the Mongols were comparatively lenient on the Han Chinese Zhao royal family of the Southern Song, sparing both the Southern Song royals in the capital Hangzhou like the Emperor Gong of Song and his mother, as well as the civilians inside it, allowing them to go about their normal business and even rehiring Southern Song officials. The Mongols did not take the southern Song palace women for themselves but instead had Han Chinese artisans in Shangdu marry the palace women. The Mongol emperor Kublai Khan even granted a Mongol princess from his own Borjigin family as a wife to the surrendered Han Chinese Southern Song Emperor Gong of Song and they fathered a son together named Zhao Wanpu.

Emperor Gong abdicated, but faithful loyalists like Zhang Jue, Wen Tianxiang, Zhang Shijie, and Lu Xiufu successively enthroned the emperor's younger brothers Zhao Shi and Zhao Bing. Zhao Shi was enthroned as Emperor Duanzong of Song far from the capital in the region of Fuzhou, but he died soon afterwards on the flight southwards into modern Guangdong. Zhao Bing was enthroned as Emperor Huaizong of Song on Lantau Island, Hong Kong. On 19 March 1279, the Mongols defeated the last of the Song forces at the naval Battle of Yamen. After the battle, as a last defiant act against the invaders, Lu Xiufu embraced the eight-year-old emperor and the pair leapt to their deaths from Mount Ya, thus marking the extinction of the Southern Song.

== Last stand of the Song loyalists (1276–1279) ==
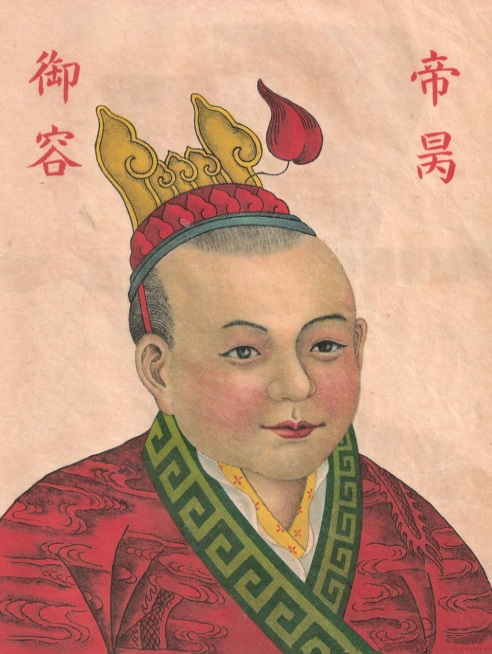
Emperor Bing, the last Song emperor claimant.

Empress Dowager Xie had secretly sent the child emperor's two brothers to Fuzhou. The strongholds of the Song loyalists fell one by one: Yangzhou in 1276, Chongqing in 1277 and Hezhou in 1279. The loyalists fought the Mongols in the mountainous Fujian–Guangdong–Jiangxi borderland. In February 1279, Wen Tianxiang, one of the Song loyalists, was captured, transported to and executed at the Yuan capital Khanbaliq (Dadu, modern Beijing).

The end of the Mongol-Song war occurred on 19 March 1279, when 1000 Chinese warships faced a fleet of 300 to 700 Yuan Mongol warships at Yamen. The Yuan fleet was commanded by Zhang Hongfan (1238–1280), a northern Chinese, and Li Heng (1236–1285), a Tangut. Catapults as a weapon system were rejected by Kublai's court, for they feared the Song fleet would break out if they used such weapons. Instead, they developed a plan for a maritime siege, in order to starve the Song into submission.

From the outset, there was a defect in the Song tactics that would later be exploited by Yuan at the conclusion of the battle. The Song wanted a stronger defensive position, and the Song fleet "roped itself together in a solid mass[,]" in an attempt to create a nautical skirmish line. Results were disastrous for the Song: they could neither attack nor maneuver. Escape was also impossible, for the Song warships lacked any nearby base. On 12 March, a number of Song combatants defected to the Mongol side. On 13 March, a Song squadron attacked some of the Mongols' northern patrol boats, in what may have been an attempted breakout. However, the attempt failed.

By 17 March, Li Heng and Zhang Hongfan opted for a decisive battle. Four Mongol fleets moved against the Song: Li Heng attacked from the north and northwest; Zhang would proceed from the southwest; and the last two fleets attacked from the south and west. Weather favored the Mongols that morning; heavy fog and rain obscured the approach of Li Heng's dawn attack. The movement of the tide and the southwestern similarly benefited the movement of the Mongol fleet which, in short order, appeared to the north of the Song. It was an unusual attack in that the Mongol fleet engaged the Song fleet stern first.

Prior to the battle, the Mongols constructed archery platforms for their marines. The position enabled the archers to direct a higher, more concentrated rate of missile fire against the enemy. Fire teams of seven or eight archers manned these platforms, and they proved devastatingly effective as the battle commenced at close quarters.

Li Heng's first attack cut the Song rope that held the Chinese fleet together. Fighting raged in close quarters combat. Before midday, the Song lost three of their ships to the Mongols. By forenoon, Li's ships broke through the Song's outer line, and two other Mongol squadrons destroyed the Song formation in the northwest corner. Around this time, the tide shifted; Li's ships drifted to the opposite direction, the north.

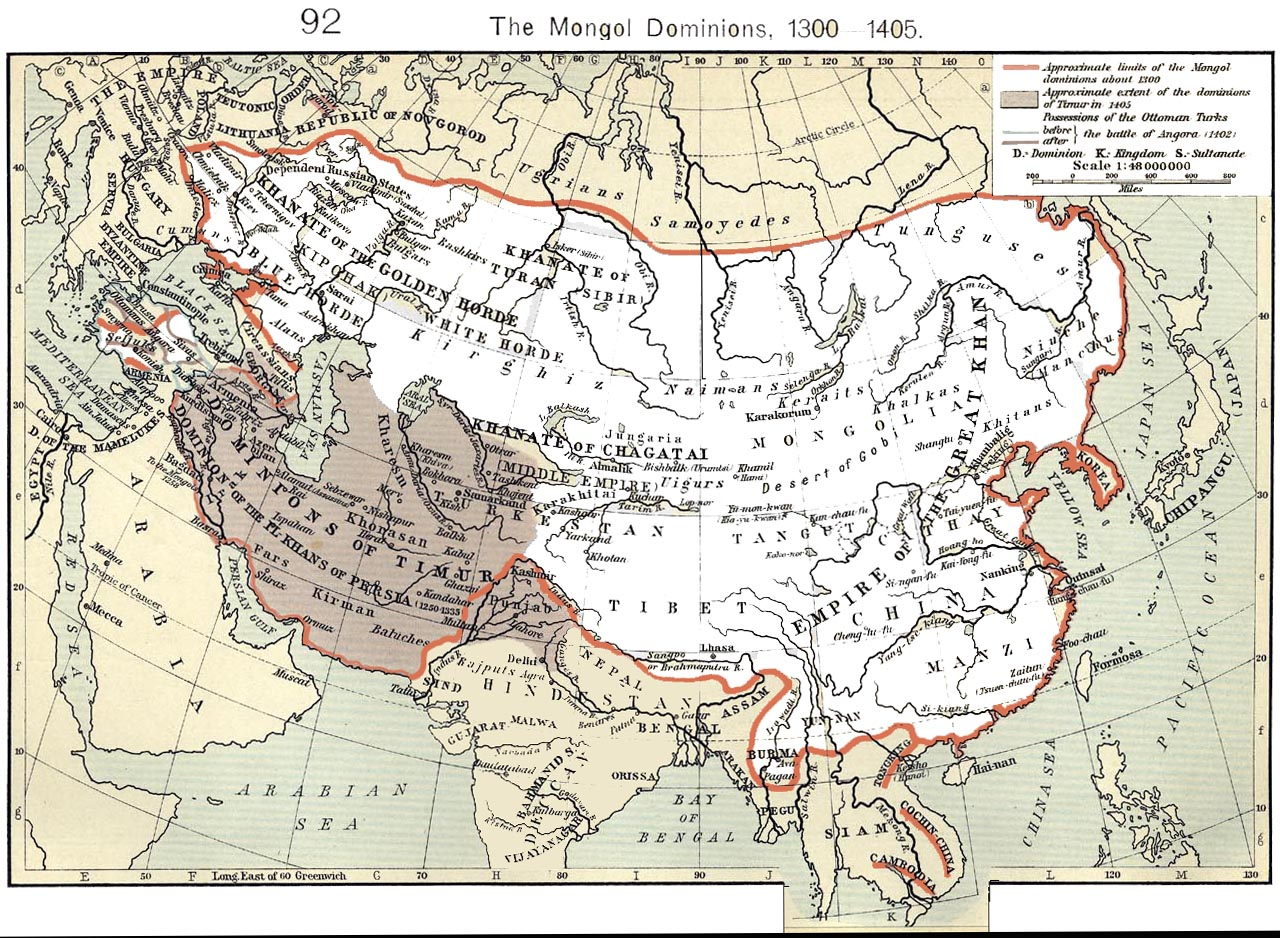
The Mongol dominions, c. 1300. The gray area is the later Timurid Empire.

The Song believed that the Mongols were halting the attack and dropped their guard. Zhang Hongfan's fleet, riding the northern current, then attacked the Song ships. Zhang was determined to capture the Song admiral, Zuo Tai. The Yuan flagship was protected by shields to negate the Song missile fire. Later, when Zhang captured the Song flagship, his own vessel was riddled with arrows. Li Heng's fleet also returned to the battle. By late afternoon, the battle was over, and the last of the Song navy surrendered.

The Song dynasty elite were unwilling to submit to Mongol rule, and opted to commit suicide. The Song councilor Lu Xiufu, who had been tasked with holding the child-emperor Zhao Bing of the Song in his arms during the battle, also elected to join the Song leaders in death. It is uncertain whether he or others decided that the young Emperor should die as well. In any event, the councilor jumped into the sea, still holding the child in his arms. Tens of thousands of Song officials and women also threw themselves into the sea and drowned. With the death of the last Song emperor, the final remnants of the Song resistance were eliminated. The victory of this naval campaign marked the completion of Kublai's conquest of China, and the onset of the consolidated Mongol Yuan dynasty.

Remnants of the Song imperial family continued to live in the Yuan dynasty like Emperor Gong of Song, Zhao Mengfu, and Zhao Yong. Zhao Mengfu spent his time painting at the Yuan court and was personally interviewed by Kublai Khan. The Vietnamese Annals recorded that remnants of the Song imperial family arrived in Thăng Long, the capital of the Đại Việt, in the winter of 1276 aboard thirty ships and eventually settled in the Nhai-Tuân district and opened a market selling medicine and silk.

== Siege policy ==
James Waterson cautioned against attributing the population drop in northern China to Mongol slaughter since much of the population may have moved to southern China under the Southern Song or died of disease and famine as agricultural and urban city infrastructure were destroyed. The Mongols spared cities from massacre and sacking if they surrendered, such as Kaifeng, which was surrendered to Subetai by Xu Li, Yangzhou, which was surrendered to Bayan by Li Tingzhi's second in command after Li Tingzhi was executed by the Southern Song, and Hangzhou, which was spared from sacking when it surrendered to Kublai Khan. Han Chinese and Khitan soldiers defected en masse to Genghis Khan against the Jurchen Jin dynasty. Towns which surrendered were spared from sacking and massacre by Kublai Khan. The Khitan reluctantly left their homeland in Manchuria as the Jin moved their primary capital from Beijing south to Kaifeng and defected to the Mongols.

== Capitulation of nobles and Tusi vassal chiefdoms in southwestern China ==
Many Tusi chiefdoms and kingdoms in southwestern China which existed before the Mongol invasions were allowed to retain their integrity as vassals of the Yuan dynasty after surrendering, including the Kingdom of Dali, the Han Chinese Yang family ruling the Chiefdom of Bozhou with its seat at the castle Hailongtun, Chiefdom of Lijiang, Chiefdom of Shuidong, Chiefdom of Sizhou, Chiefdom of Yao'an, Chiefdom of Yongning, and Mu'ege. As were Korea under Mongol rule and the Kingdom of Qocho.

The Han Chinese nobles Duke Yansheng and Celestial Masters continued possessing their titles in the Yuan dynasty since the previous dynasties.

== Chinese exile in Vietnam and Champa helping anti-Mongol resistance ==
Southern Song military officers and civilian officials fled to overseas countries, namely Vietnam and Champa. In Vietnam, they intermarried with the Vietnamese ruling elite, and in Champa, they served the government there as recorded by Zheng Sixiao. Former Song soldiers served in the Vietnamese army prepared by emperor Trần Thánh Tông against the second Mongol invasion.

Professor Liam Kelley noted that people from Song like Zhao Zhong and Xu Zongdao escaped to Vietnam (then under the Trần dynasty) after the Mongol invasion of China and helped the Trần fighting against the Mongol invasion. The Daoist Chinese cleric Xu Zongdao, who recorded the Mongol invasion, referred to them as "Northern bandits". He quoted the Đại Việt Sử Ký Toàn Thư which said "When the Song [dynasty] was lost, its people came to us. Nhật Duật took them in. There was Zhao Zhong who served as his personal guard. Therefore, among the accomplishments in defeating the Yuan [i.e., Mongols], Nhật Duật had the most."

== Sources ==
- Grousset, René (1970). The Empire of the Steppes: A History of Central Asia. Rutgers University Press. ISBN 978-0-8135-1304-1.
- Smith, John Masson Jr. (January–March 1998). "Review: Nomads on Ponies vs. Slaves on Horses". Journal of the American Oriental Society. 118 (1). American Oriental Society: 54–62. doi:10.2307/606298. JSTOR 606298.
