= Hedi (policy) =

Chinese economic policy

- Chinese: 和糴
Transcriptions
Standard Mandarin
- Hanyu Pinyin: Hé Dí

Hedi was an economic policy of the imperial China. It was the state purchase of food supplies from farmers. As a means to control the price of grains and foods, it is an early example of government procurement.

The policy was adopted in the year of 488 by Emperor Xiaowen of Northern Wei as a counter measure of drought. The state purchases food supplies and stock them. When drought attacks, the stocked foods were sold in order to prevent famine. Later, the purchased foods were also used as rations for the frontier force of Northern Wei dynasty.

The policy had always kept the price of state purchased foods higher than the market price of these foods. However, during the reign of Emperor Dezong of Tang, the imperial court purchased foods with a price that was lower than the market price. Chancellor Lu Zhi critically pointed out that, when purchasing food with such low price, the government was turning the policy of Hedi into a type of tax which aggravated the burden of tax payers (since they had to "sell" their harvests with a price that would never benefit them).

During the Mongol invasion of Song dynasty, the Song army had to constantly engage the Mongols. The cost of war was extremely high, and the imperial court began to forcibly purchase food supplies from farmers. The official price by then was considerably lower than the market price. Government officials also acknowledged the fact that the policy had become pure robbery. Since the forced purchase of harvests did not compensate sellers, the policy discouraged the development of agriculture. Jia Sidao sought to abolish the Song hedi policy, but Jia was ultimately assassinated by the Song court.

Between 1159 and 1259, the annual amount of forced purchase of food supplies from farmers had increased from 2,300,000 picul to 5,600,000 picul. In Yuan dynasty, most of the cases of Hedi were not voluntary. The policy of Hedi continued to exist in Ming and Qing dynasty until the fall of the last dynasty in 1911.

The abuse of Hedi did not originate from the late Song dynasty. Recorded abuse of Hedi date back as early as the year of 787. In 1114 and 1126 two different cases of abuse were reported. Local government officials reportedly lowered the price of purchase or collected additional tax without any authorization.

Despite the later abuses, Hedi did provide farmers benefits. The policy was especially effective in a surplus of food supplies which causes the price of grains to drop. With the state purchase of excessive food supplies, farmers do not need to sell them in a low price in years of surplus.
