= Empress Quan =

Empress Quan may refer to:

- Empress Quan Huijie, empress of Eastern Wu during the Three Kingdoms
- Empress Quan (Song dynasty), wife of Emperor Duzong of Song
