= Wuying Pagoda =

Buddhist pagoda in Wuchang, Hubei, China

- 無影塔 (興福寺塔, 宋興福寺塔, 武漢千年古塔, 洪山無影塔)
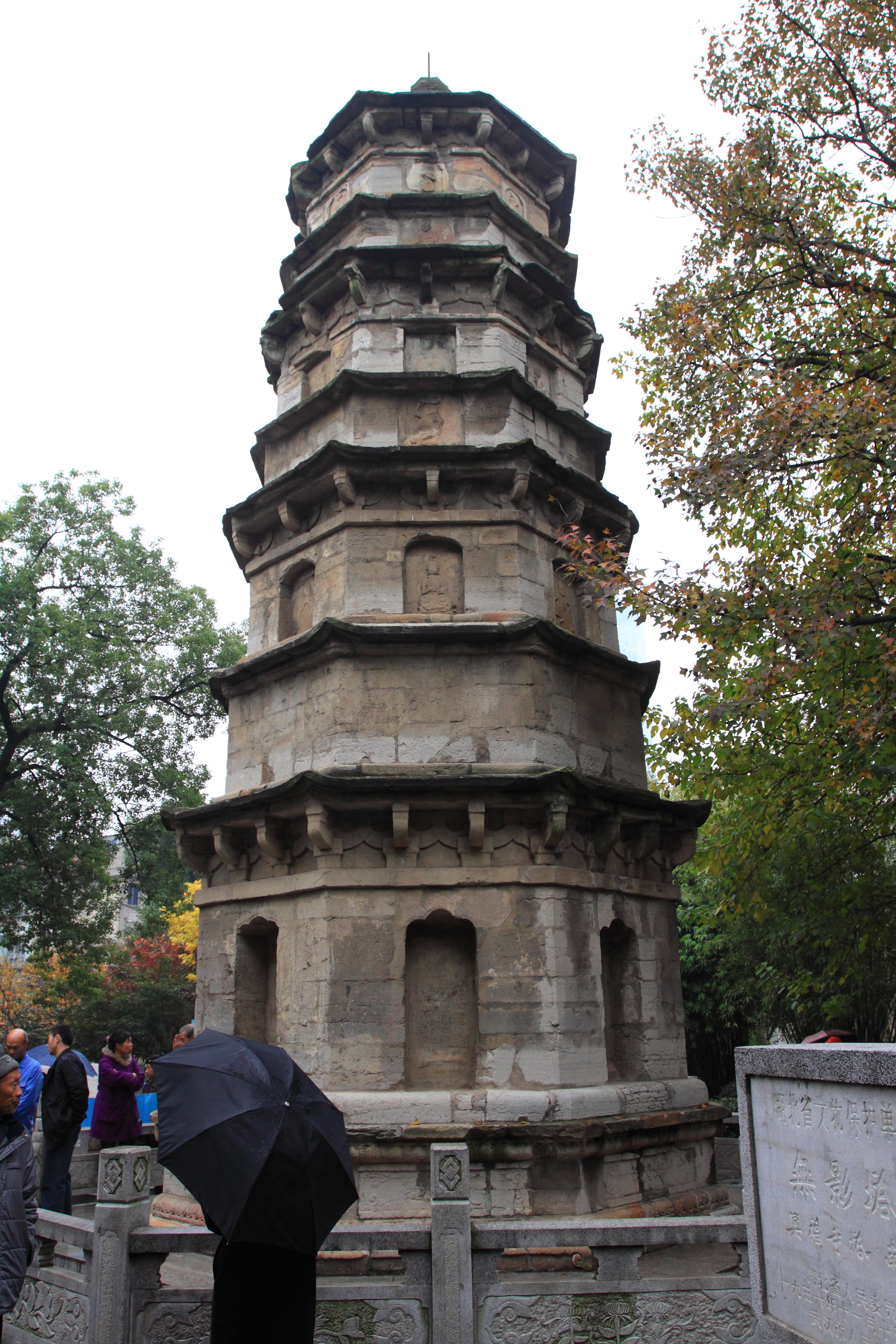
- Perspective from Northeast

- Location in Hubei Wuying Pagoda (Hubei)

Religion
- Affiliation: Buddhism

Location
- Location: Zhongnanlu, Wuchang, Wuhan, Hubei
- Country: China
- Interactive map of Wuying Pagoda
- Coordinates: 30.53350°N 114.334800°E

Architecture
- Completed: 552-4 (original pagoda); 1270 南宋咸淳六年 (rebuilt pagoda)
- Materials: Stone

Wuying Pagoda
- Traditional Chinese: 無影塔
- Simplified Chinese: 无影塔
- Literal meaning: "Shadowless" Pagoda
Transcriptions
Standard Mandarin
- Hanyu Pinyin: Wúyǐng Tǎ

Alternative Chinese name
- Traditional Chinese: 興福寺塔
- Simplified Chinese: 兴福寺塔
Transcriptions
Standard Mandarin
- Hanyu Pinyin: Xīngfúsì Tǎ

The Wuying Pagoda (traditional Chinese: 無影塔; simplified Chinese: 无影塔; pinyin: Wúyǐng Tǎ; lit. 'Shadowless Pagoda'), also known as the Xingfu Temple Pagoda (traditional Chinese: 興福寺塔; simplified Chinese: 兴福寺塔; pinyin: Xīngfúsì Tǎ) and The Thousand Year-Old Pagoda of Wuhan (traditional Chinese: 武漢千年古塔; simplified Chinese: 武汉千年古塔; pinyin: Wǔhàn Qiān Nián Gǔtǎ), is a Buddhist pagoda in Wuchang, Wuhan, Hubei Province, China. Built of stone 750 years ago during the final years of the Southern Song Dynasty, it is the oldest standing architectural feature in Wuhan. Wuying Pagoda is a Major Historical and Cultural Site Protected at the National Level.

== History ==
=== Original Pagoda ===
The origin of Wuying Pagoda stretches back to the later part of the Northern and Southern dynasties period, it having been built during the reign of Emperor Yuan of Liang as part of the Jin'an Temple (晋安寺). Subsequently, during the reign of Emperor Wen of Sui, the temple was renamed Xingfu Temple (興福寺/兴福寺). The pagoda then derived its name from its connection to this temple.

=== Repeated destruction and rebuilding ===
The original pagoda having been destroyed at some earlier time, it was rebuilt in 1270 (咸淳六年) in the throes of the overthrow of the Southern Song during the reign of Emperor Duzong. The pagoda bears inscriptions dating from the period. The pagoda was designed to incorporate Buddhist iconography through various symbolic features and figures including images of Buddha, bodhisattvas, heavenly kings and celestial guards. While of solid stone construction, it is modeled upon multi-storeyed wooden pagodas. Some of the original artistry has been damaged.

Xingfu Temple was left in ruins in the 19th century, victim of the Taiping Rebellion. In 1953, Wuying Pagoda was located in a courtyard next to a kitchen in a residential area to the east of Mount Hong within the grounds of South Central University for Nationalities, and was tilting severely. On November 15, 1956, the pagoda was among the first 101 locations in Hubei province declared a Major Historical and Cultural Site Protected at the Provincial Level. In the winter of 1962/1963, it was moved to its current site at the western foot of Mount Hong adjoining a new tomb for Shi Yang that was erected in Hongshan Park by the local Ministry of Culture.

=== Current status ===
The pagoda has eight sides and seven storeys, with four of the storeys including carvings of Buddhist figures carved in small niches. It is 11.25 meters tall, with a diameter of 4.25 meters at the "Sumeru Throne" (須彌座 xūmízuò) style base.

On December 18, 2001, the Cultural Department of Wuchang completed repairs to the pagoda. In the seventh listing of major historical sites in China published on March 5, 2013, the pagoda was listed as a Major Historical and Cultural Site Protected at the National Level from the Song Dynasty, with historical site number 7-1213-3-511.

== Legend ==
=== Dragon Vein ===
According to one tradition, there is a 'dragon vein' (江南龙脉) under the mountains in this area, including Mount She (Snake Mountain). The head of the dragon is said to be beneath the Yellow Crane Tower and the area beneath Wuying Pagoda the tail of the dragon. The pagoda was built to block the dragon vein. According to another, related in the Annals of Huguang Province (湖广通志), it was built on a vein of water which was connected to the Yangtze River.

=== 'Shadowless' ===
There are multiple and varied claims made about the pagoda's lack of a shadow. The claim is made that the pagoda casts no shadow at noon on the summer solstice, or at noon on the winter solstice. More sensationally, the claim is made that the pagoda never casts a shadow. An explanation given for the modern appearance of a shadow is the change in the pagoda's location. The name is often used as the focus of puns and other jokes.

== Gallery ==
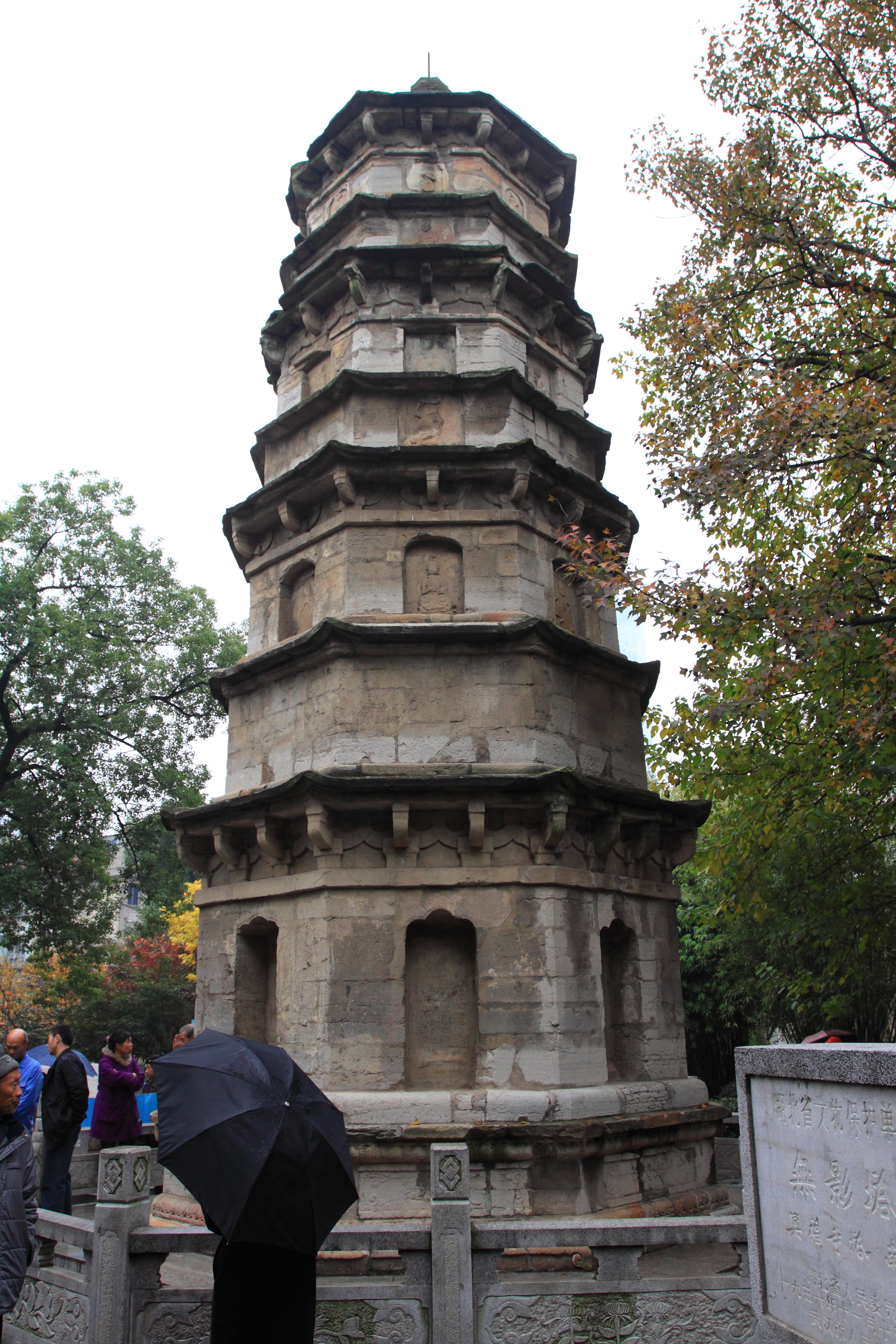
Perspective from Northeast with former monument in foreground

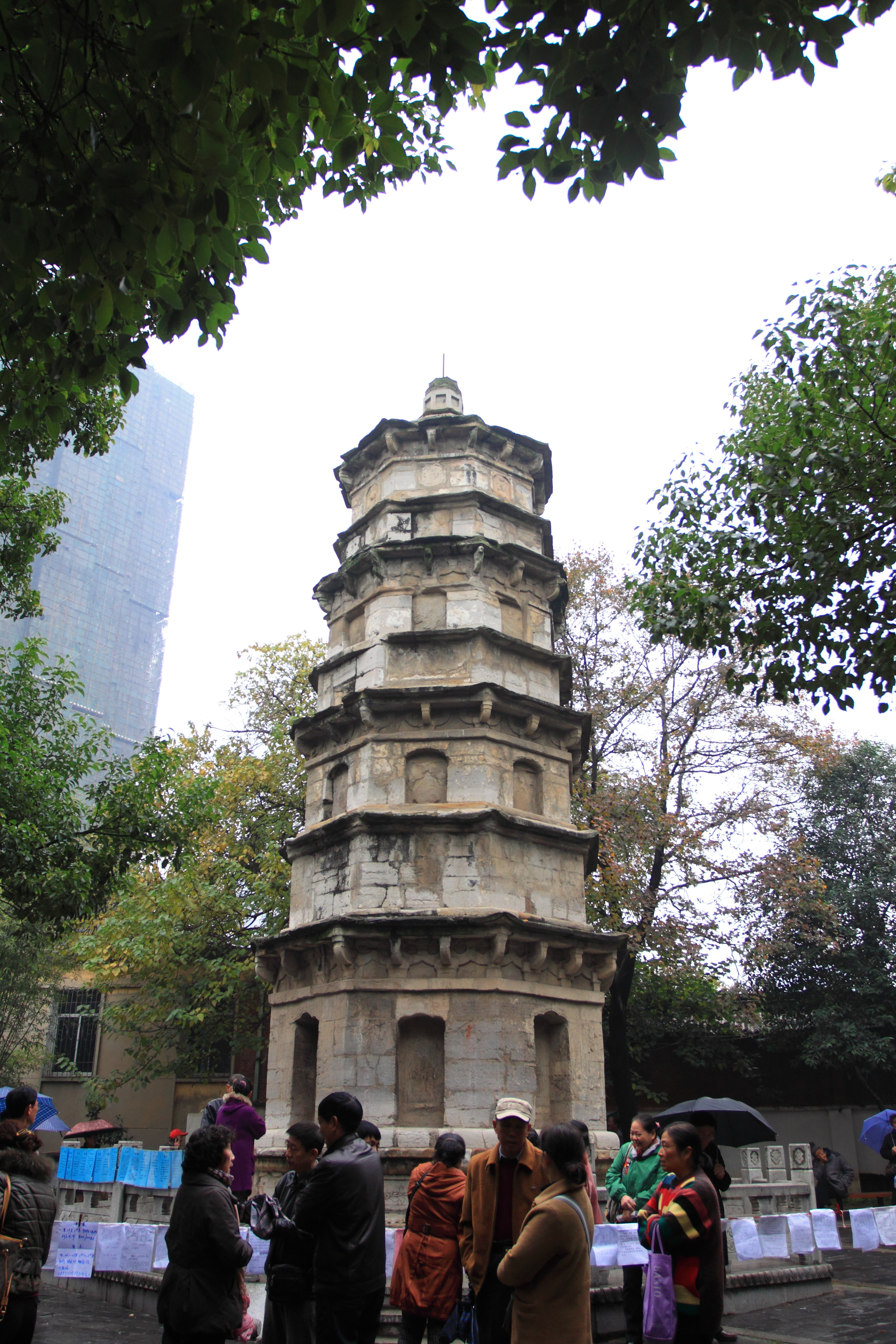
Perspective from Southeast

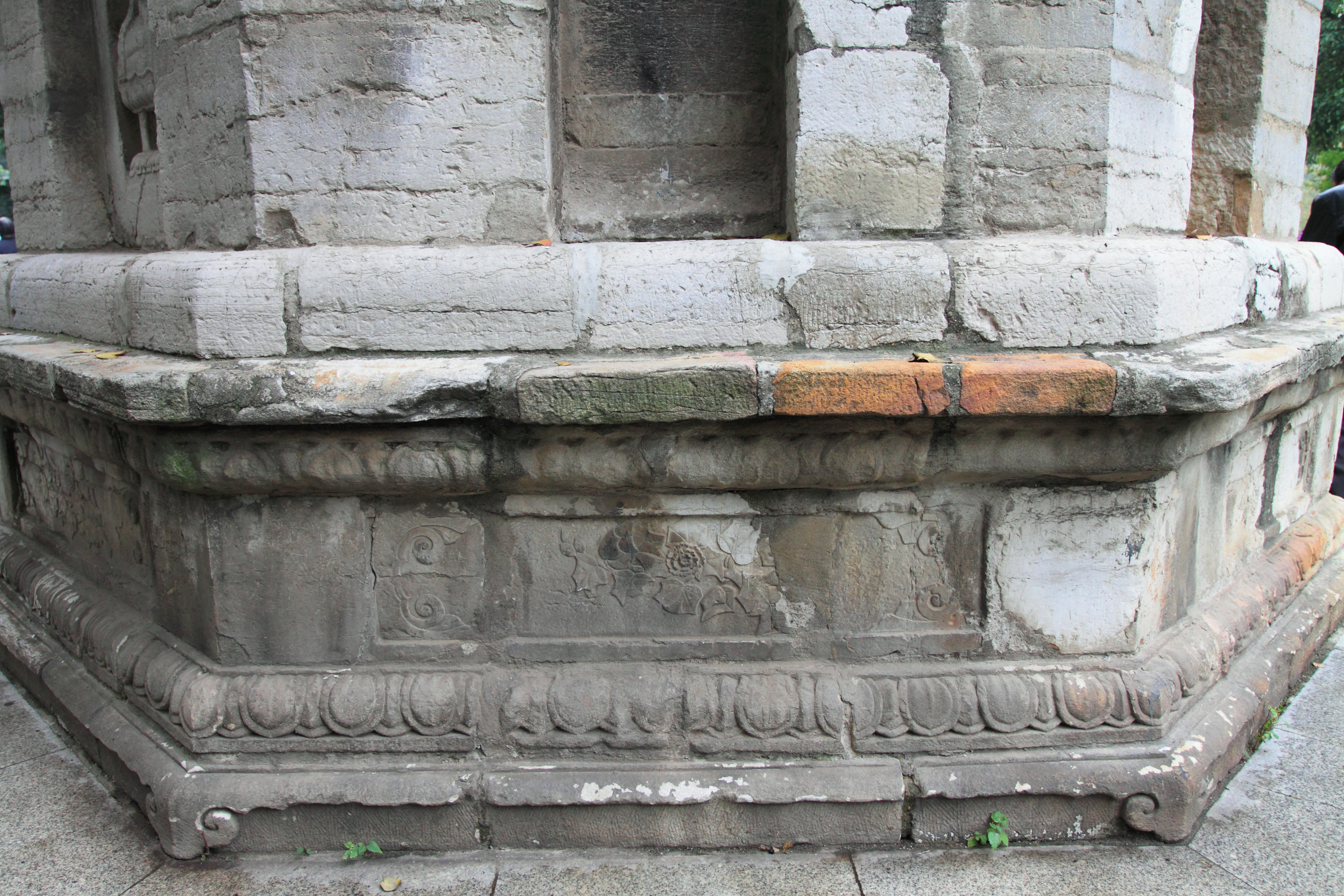
Sumeru Throne (須彌座 xūmízuò), common feature of the base of Buddhist pagodas

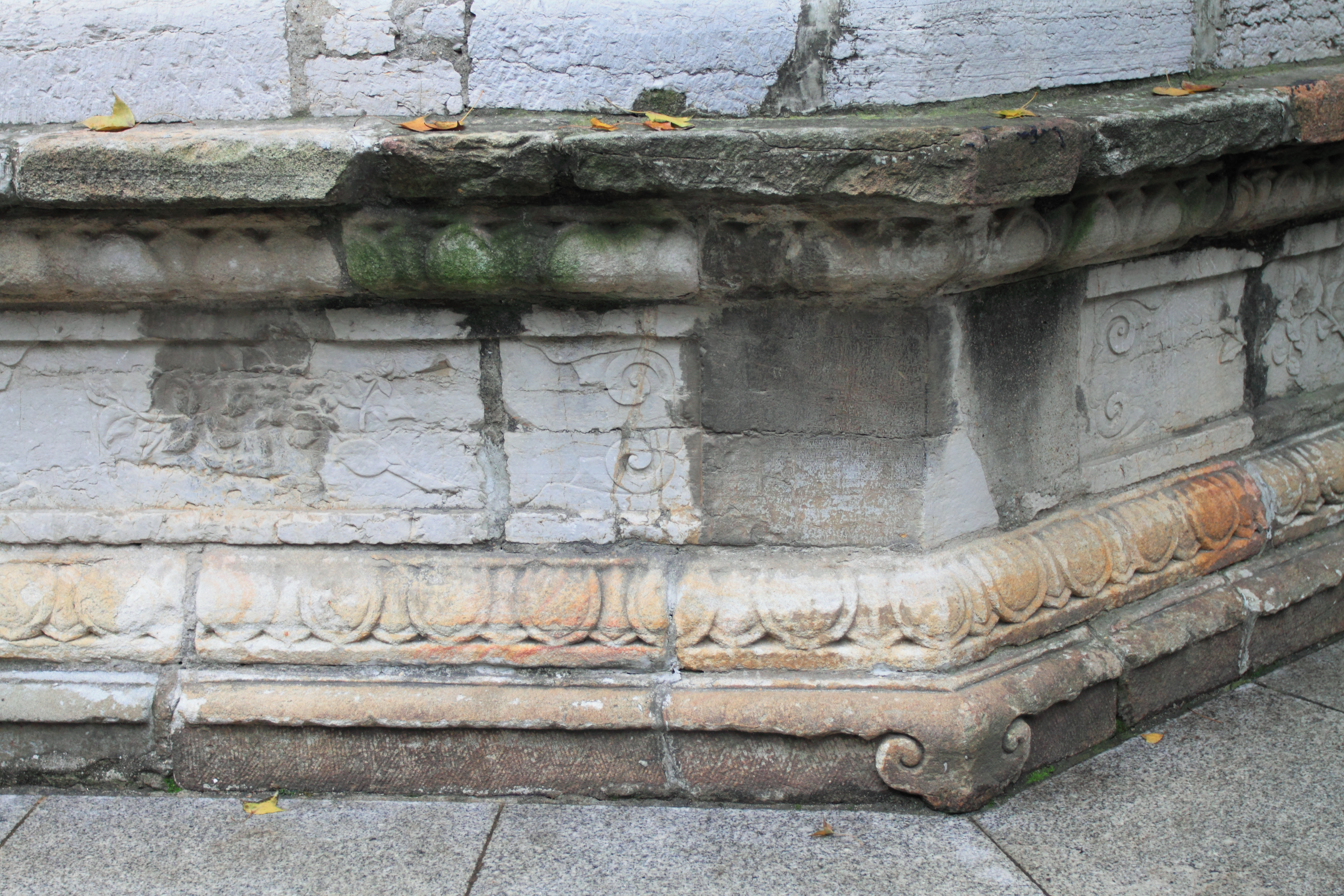

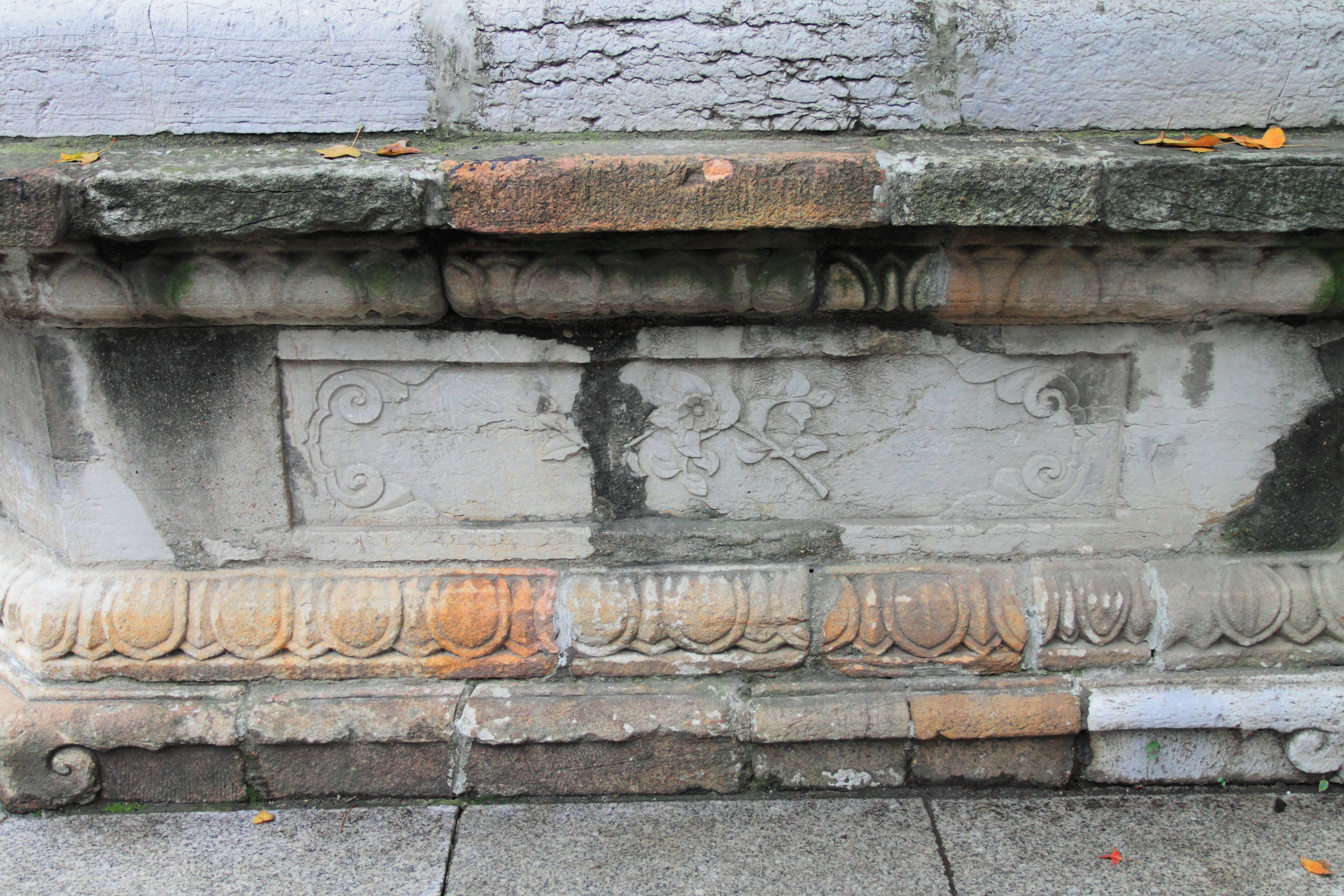

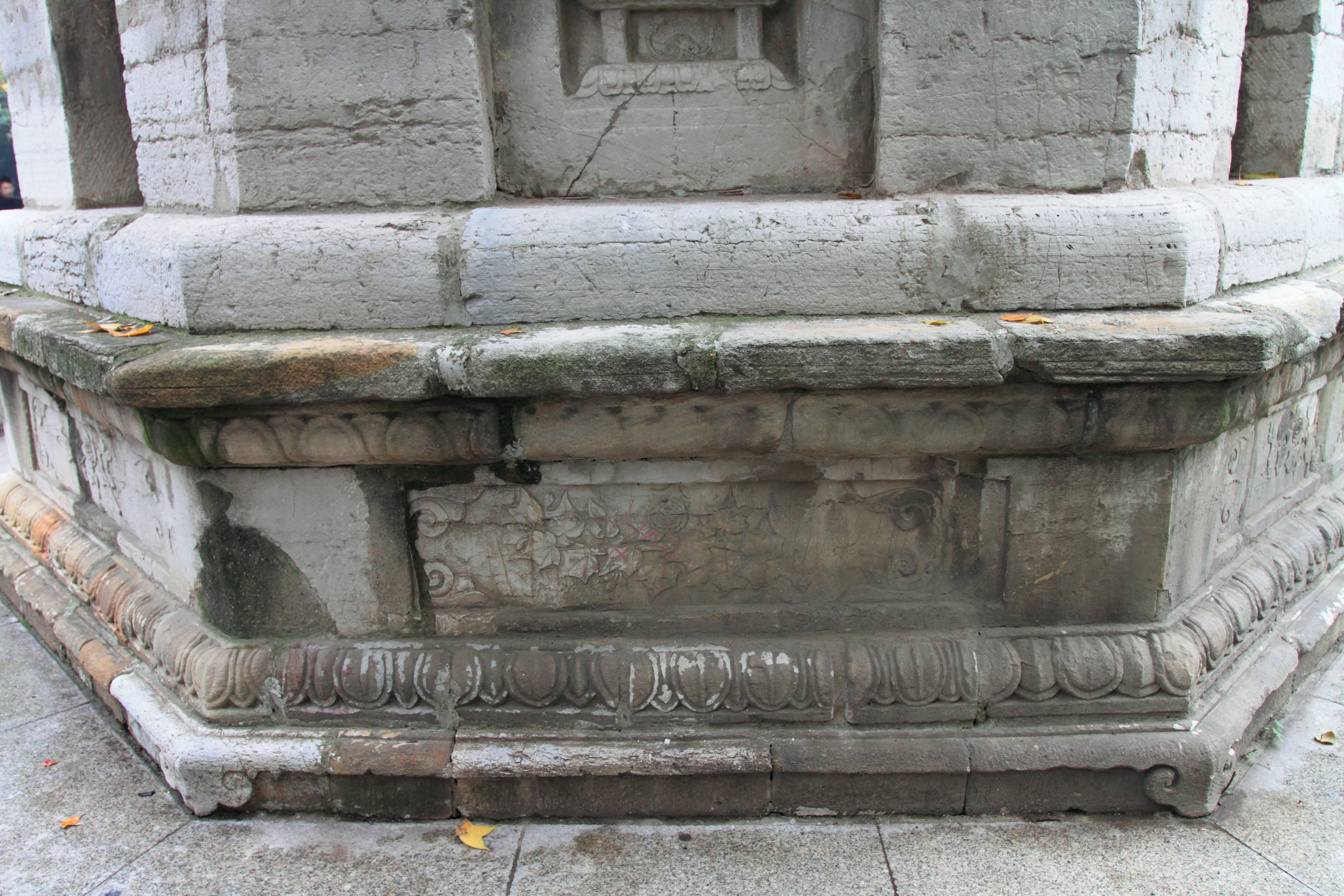

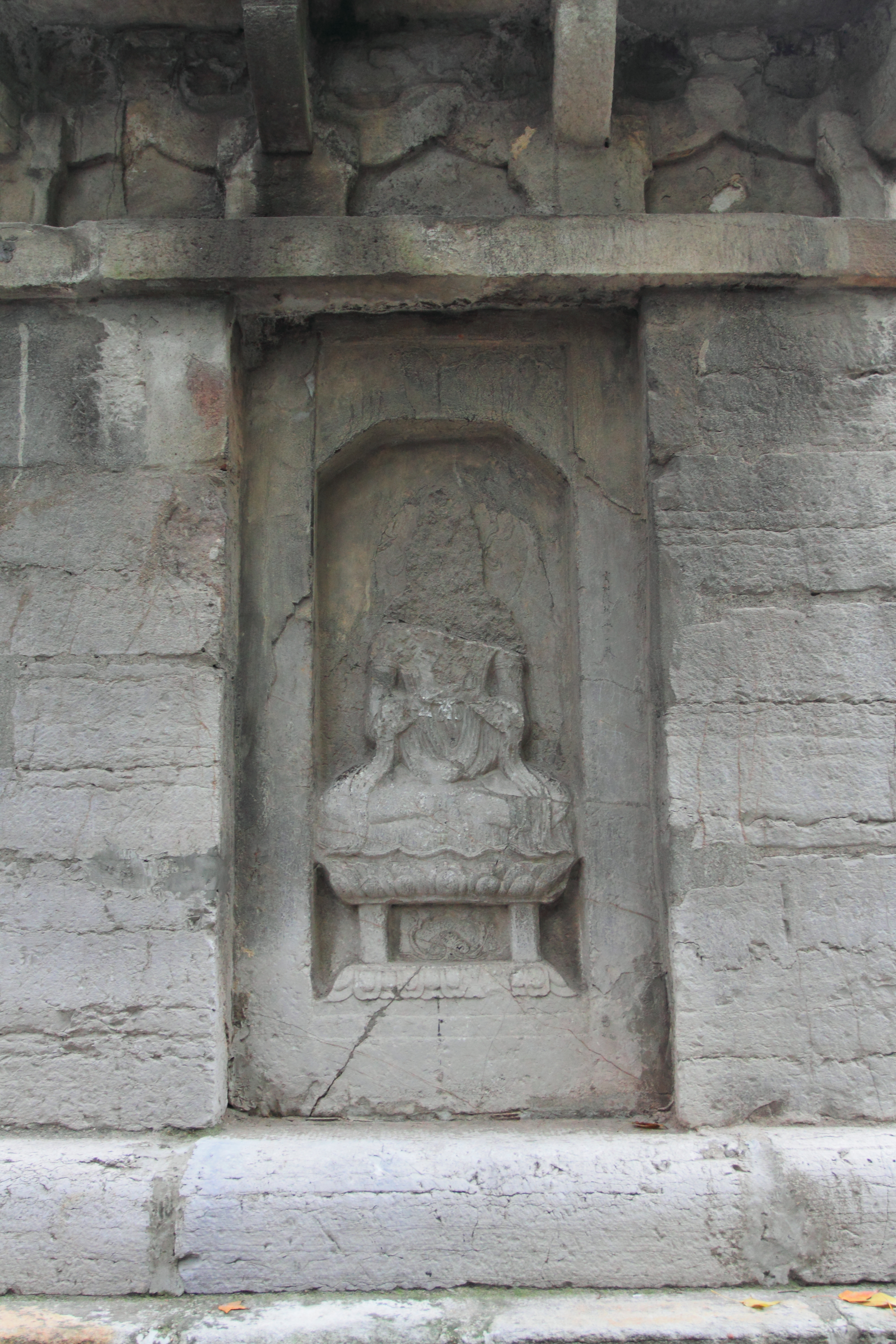
Damaged artistry in a niche on the first storey

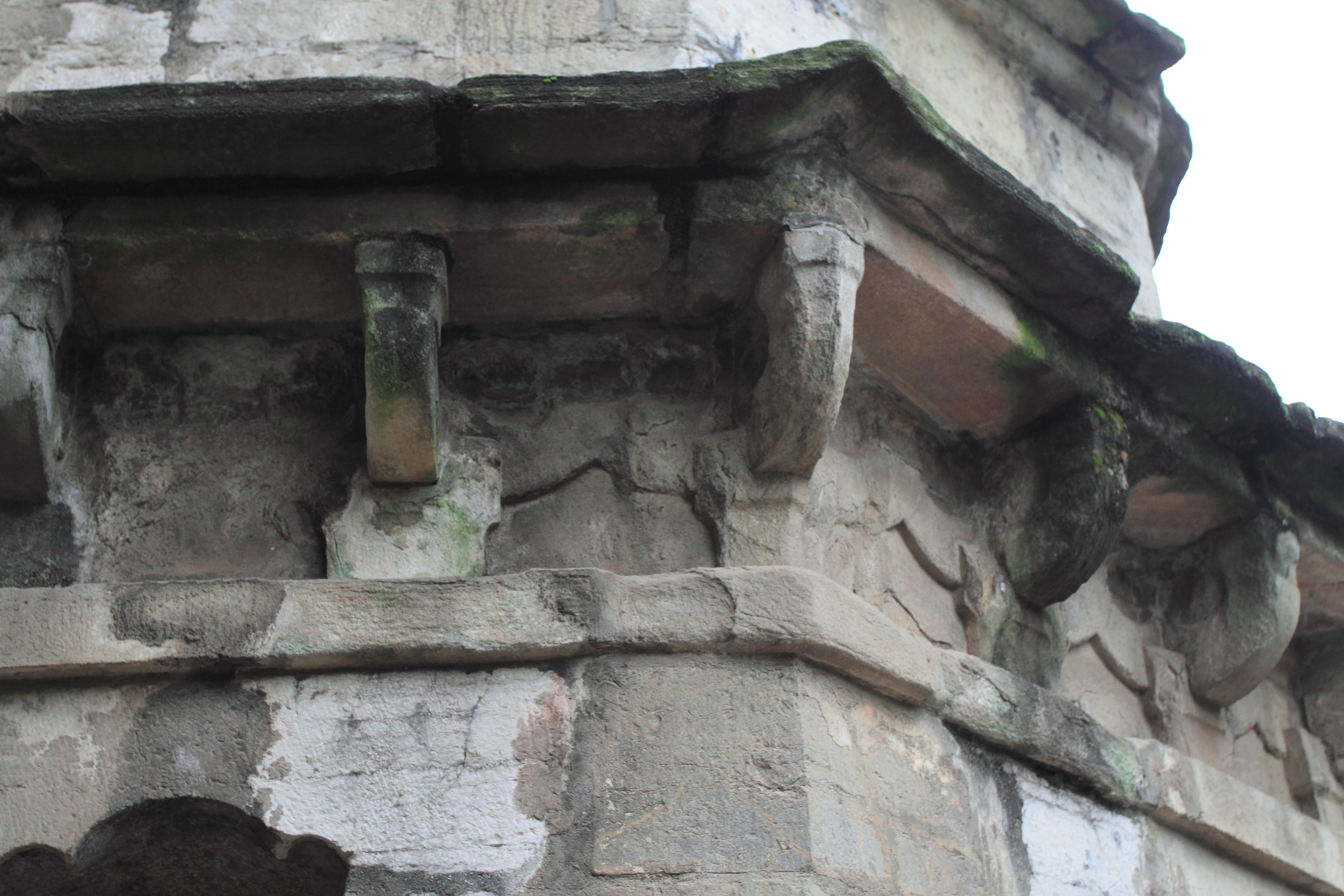
Eaves and corbel brackets made to imitate wooden structure (出檐和仿木斗栱)

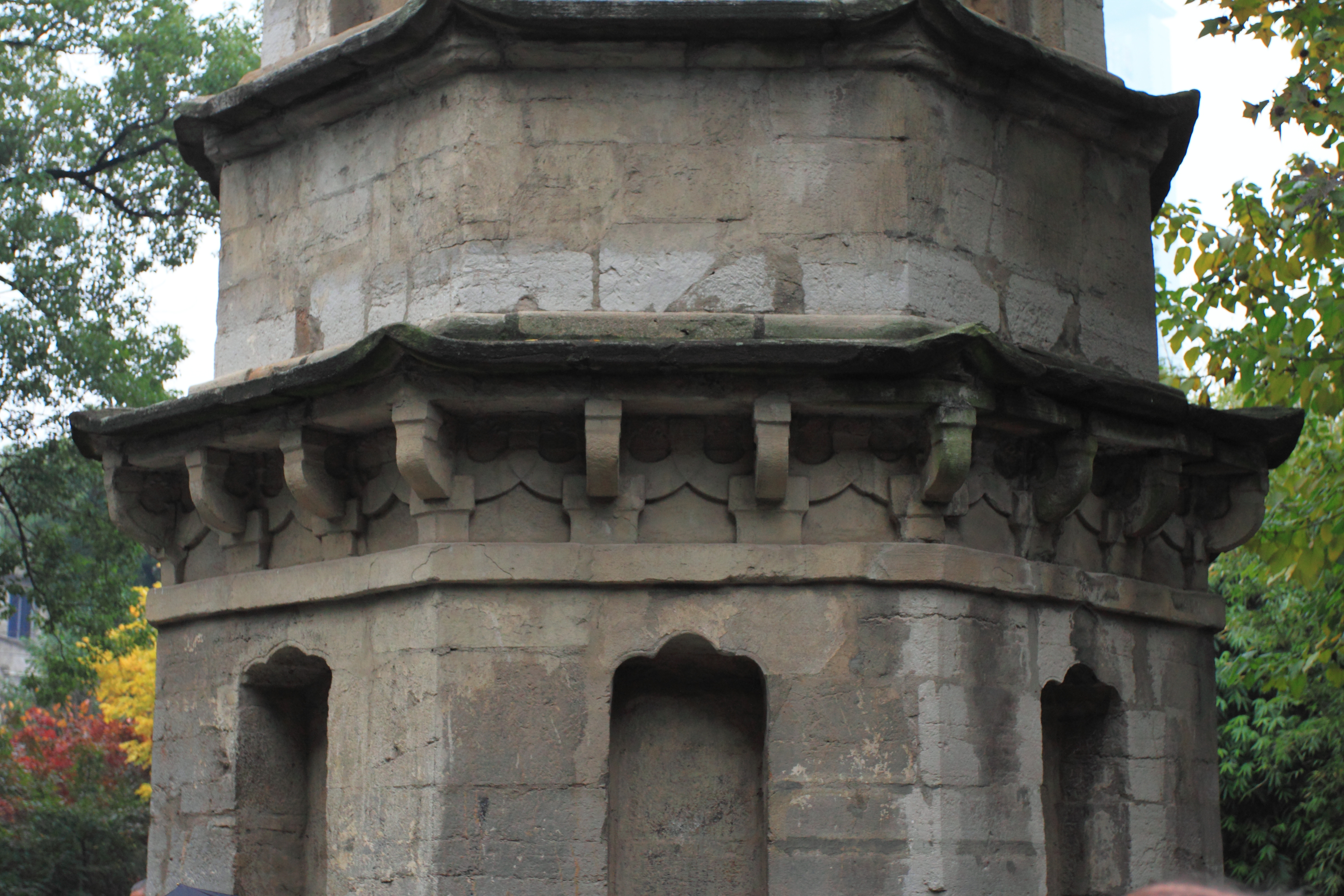
Lower Storeys

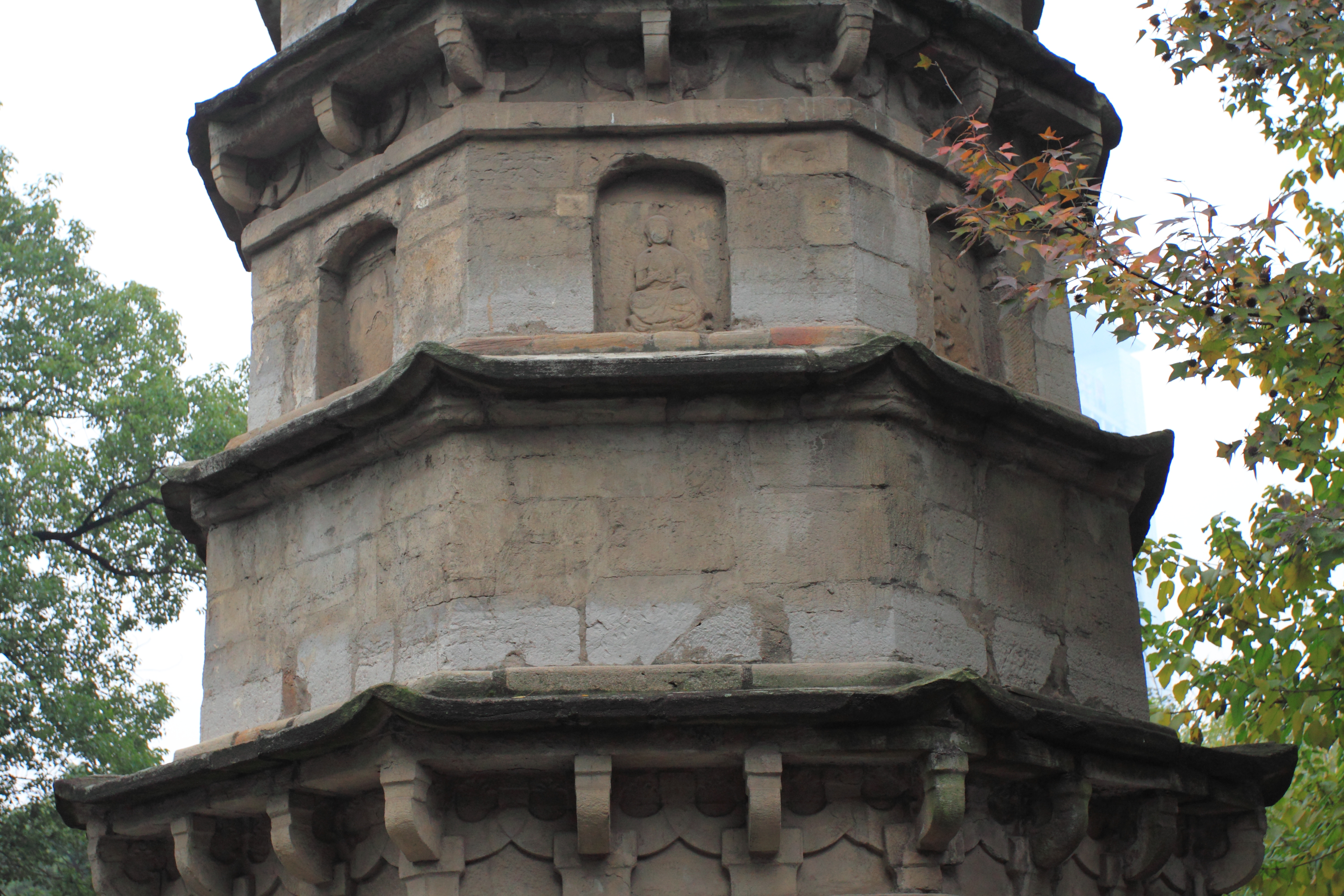
Storeys one through four with intact niche sculpture visible

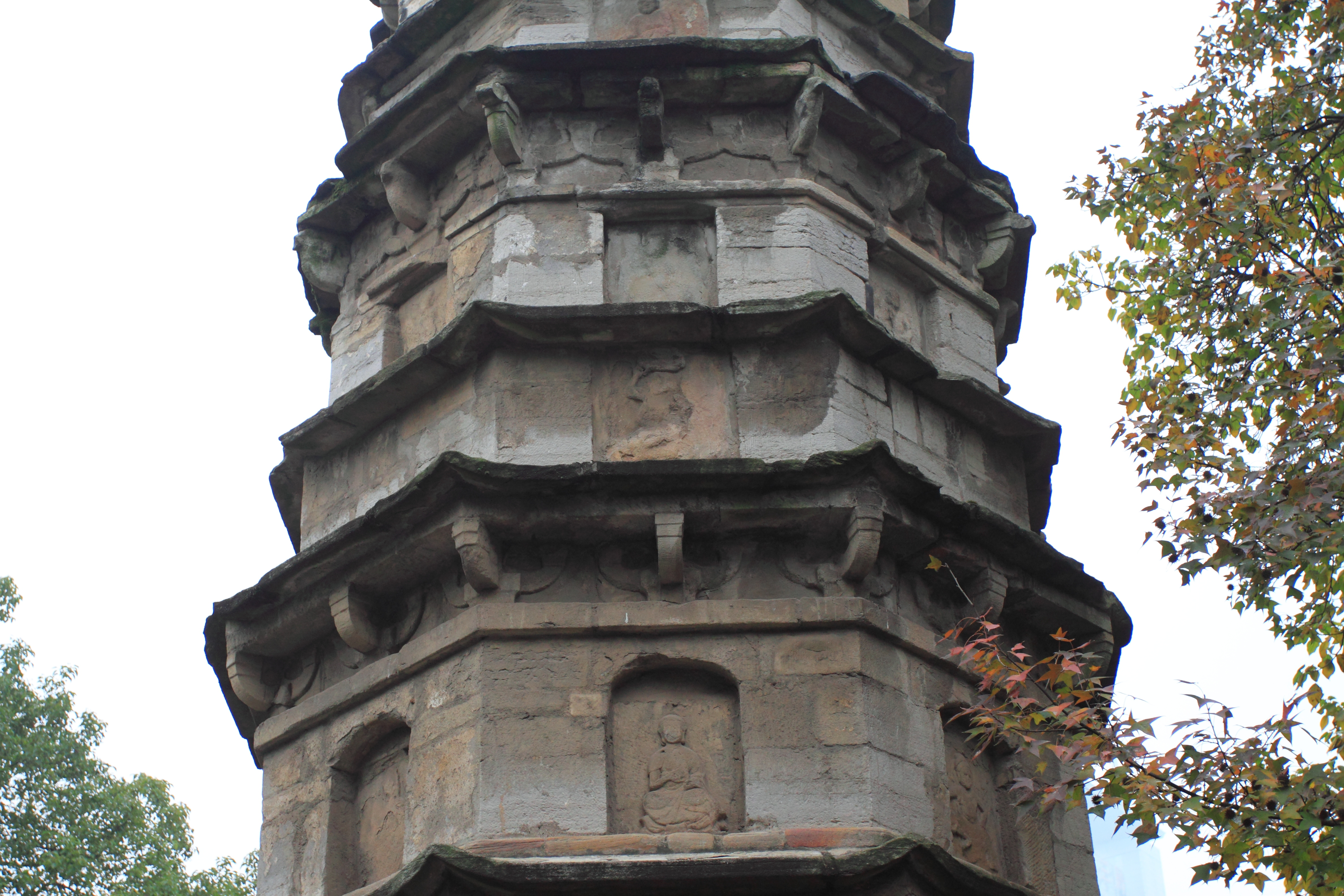
Storeys three through seven

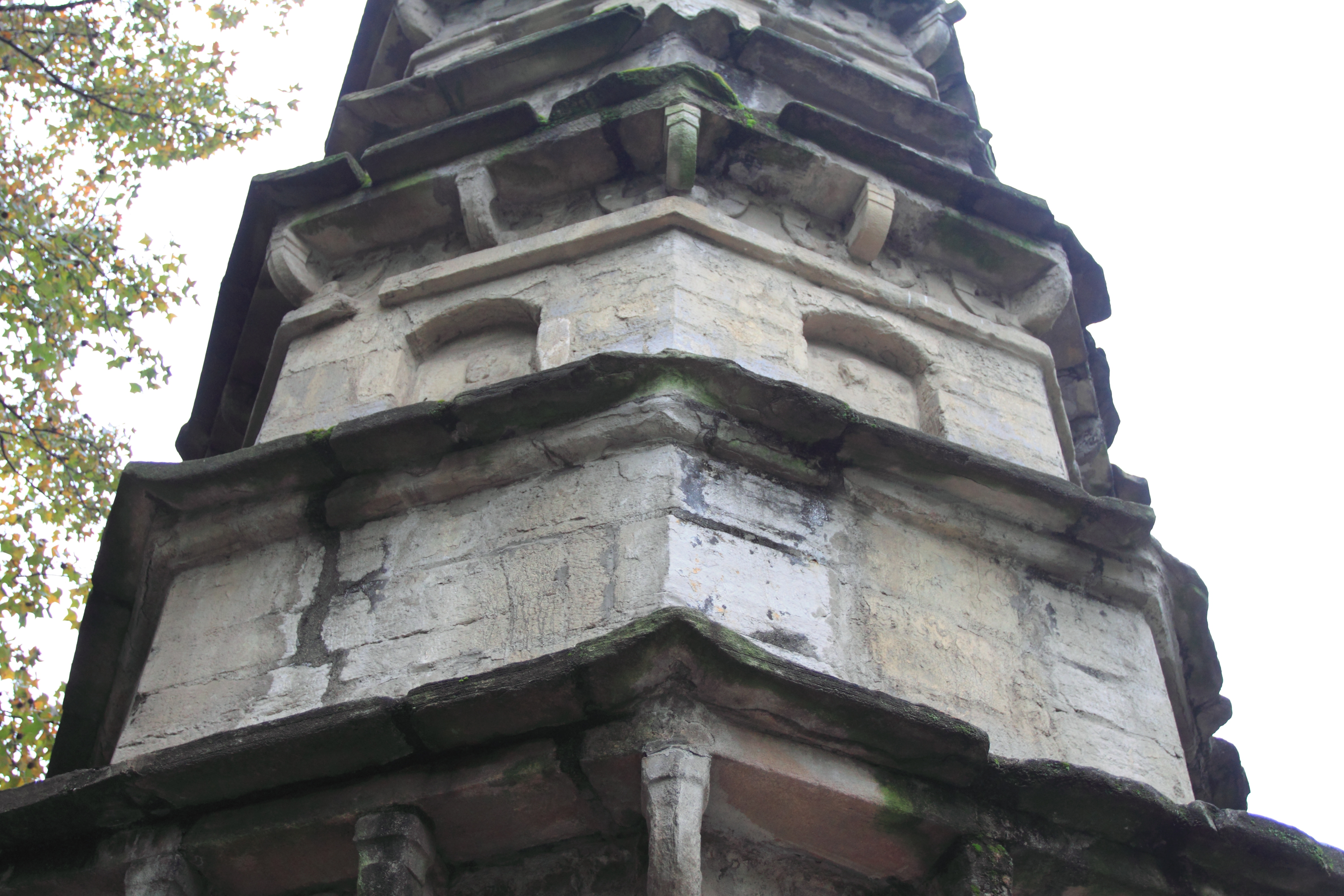

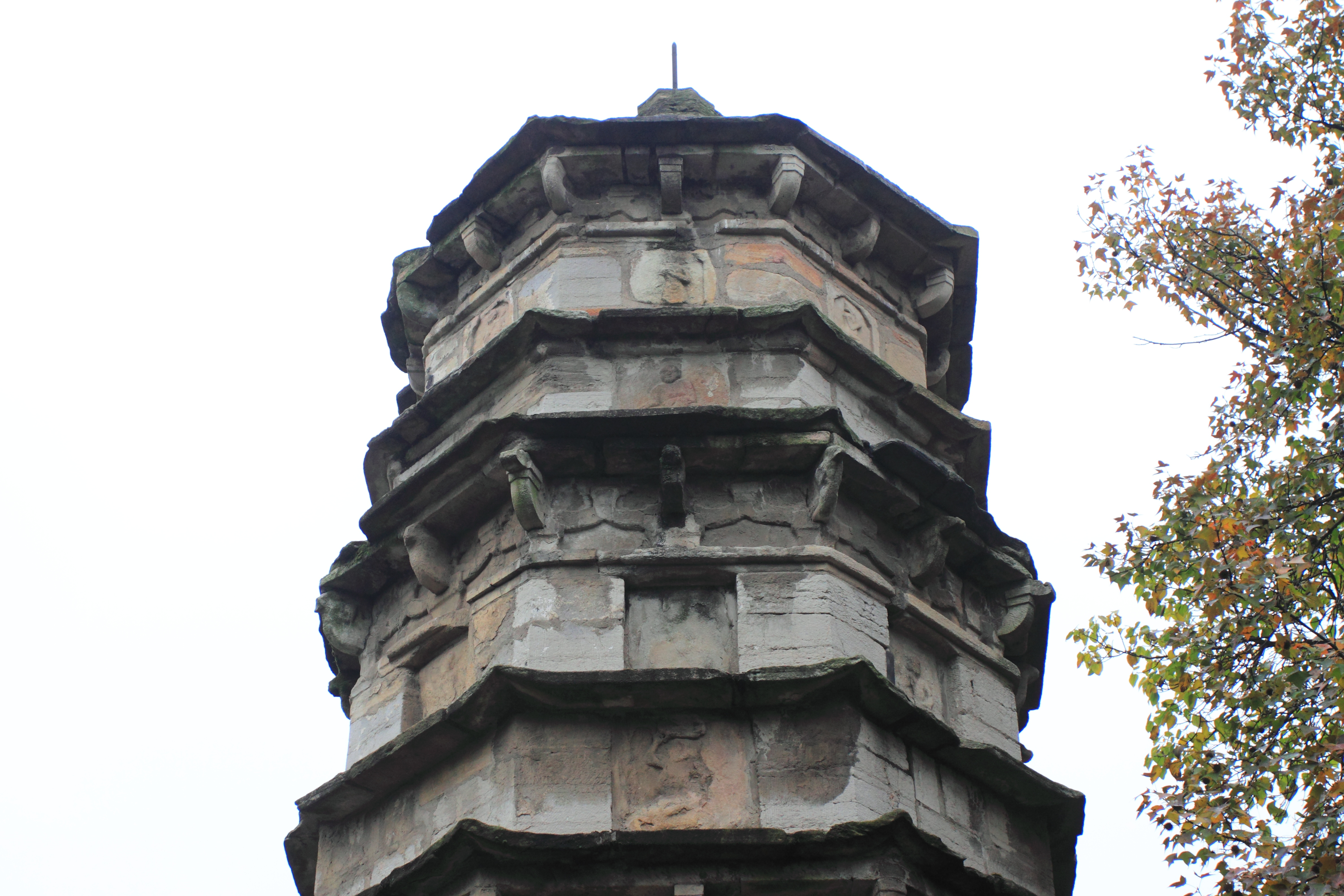
Upper story ornamentation visible

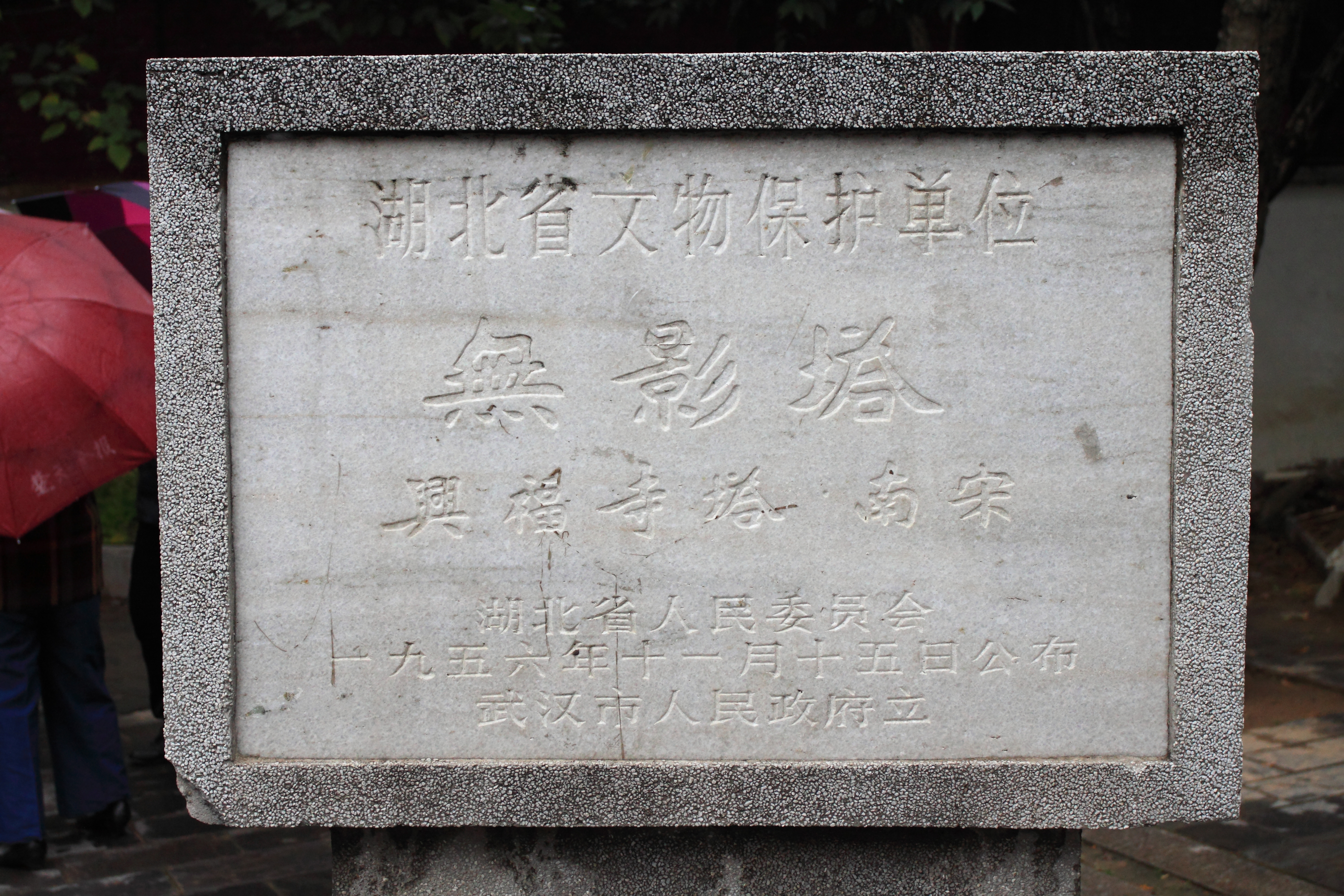
Text:
湖北省文物保护单位
無影塔
興福寺塔 南宋
湖北省人民委员会
一九五六年十一月十五日公布
武汉市人民政府立
Former monument recognizing the inclusion of the pagoda in the November 15, 1956 declaration of Major Historical and Cultural Sites at the Provincial Level for Hubei Province

== See also ==
- Chinese pagoda
- Chinese architecture
- Architecture of the Song Dynasty
- Seokgatap, ancient South Korean pagoda also referred to as the 'Shadowless Pagoda'
