= Shi Yang =

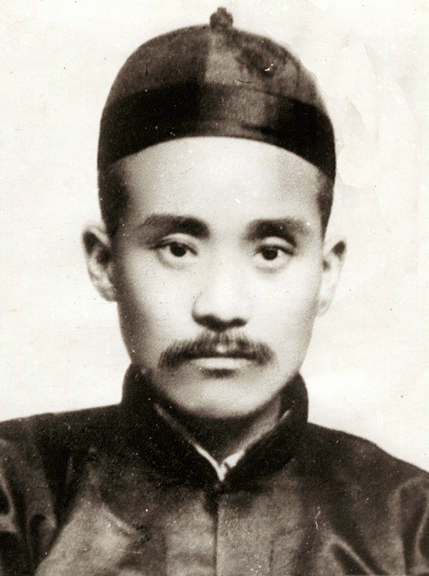
Shi Yang

Shi Yang (Chinese: 施洋; pinyin: Shī Yáng; June 13, 1889 - February 15, 1923), born Shi Jichao (Chinese: 施吉超; pinyin: Shī Jíchāo), courtesy name Bogao (Chinese: 伯高; pinyin: Bógāo). Shi Yang was from the small village of Yangjiahe (杨家河村) in Zhushan County, Hubei. He was a lawyer by trade, as well as a member of the Chinese Communist Party, and was one of the early leaders of the Chinese workers' rights movement.

== Life ==
Shi Yang's family were rural farmers and were very poor. In 1907 he was accepted into the Yunyang Government Agricultural School's Silk Production study program, transferring three years later into the Yunyang Agricultural Middle School. Most schools, including Yang's, had closed during and after the chaos of the Xinhai Revolution, and therefore in 1912 Yang decided to return to his home village and establish a school, acting as its headmaster.

Shi also founded an agricultural association and was asked to serve as its chair. In 1914, Yang was accepted into the Hubei Police School and in 1915 entered the Hubei School of Jurisprudence (Chinese: 湖北法政学校) to study law. He graduated as the school's valedictorian in 1917 and began practicing law at an office in Wuchang. In 1919, Yang opened his own practice across the Yangtze in Hankou at #5 Leatherwork Alley, Hualou Street (Chinese: 花楼街皮业巷5号) and soon joined the newly created Wuhan Jurisprudence Society and was selected as Vice Chair.

In the 1910s, Shi Yang became an anarchist for a time, but later considered anarchism as an empty dream and turned to Marxism-Leninism. In June 1922, Yang was introduced to the Chinese Communist Party by Xu Baihao and Xiang Ying and became a member. Two months later in August, he participated in the founding of the Wuhan Workers Union the earliest regional union in all of China (the group replaced the "Wuhan" in its name with "Hubei Province" in October of that year). Yang served as legal counsel for the union. Yang used his status as a lawyer to support strikers by factory workers and rickshaw drivers, and participated in many different workers' movements in Wuhan, often as a leader.

On February 1, 1923, the Beijing-Wuhan Railroad Workers' Association held a large formal conference in Zhengzhou. As Yang was the Association's legal counsel, he played a large part in the conference's activities. The conference met with obstruction from the Zhengzhou Police authorities, and there were several serious clashes between conference attendees and the police. That evening, a secret meeting of the conference was held, demanding that the government meet all of the workers' demands - dismissal of the Zhengzhou Police Chief, reimbursement of workers' lost property, etc. - within two days, otherwise the association would implement a full strike of workers along the entire Jinghan railway. Shi Yang and Lin Xiangqian were chosen as leaders of the strike in the Jiang'an area and they returned to Wuhan by train after the meeting.

The following days saw more workers' meetings to organize actions. On February 4, the Beijing-Wuhan Association issued the order to go on strike, and Yang instructed all Wuhan-area members to comply. On the afternoon of February 7, Xiao Yaonan, the military general who controlled most of Hubei Province, began using military force to put down the strike. That evening, Shi Yang was arrested at his home and taken to the Hankou police station. The following morning, he was transferred to a military facility in Wuchang and in the afternoon was put on trial by a military tribunal. Yang represented himself pro se and vehemently criticized the reactionary nature of the Beiyang Army. Warlord Wu Peifu took command of the situation and without waiting for the military trial to conclude, issued a secret order for Yang's execution, which took place in the early morning of February 15, 1923.

A large tomb was built for Yang in Wuchang in 1963 and he was re-interred there. Wuying Pagoda was relocated to the west of his tomb at that time. It is located on Wuluo Street, about two miles up from the Yellow Crane Tower and the Yangtze River. In 1993, a five-meter bronze statue of Yang was erected in his home village.
