= Xie Daoqing =

Xie Daoqing 謝道清
- Lady of Shouchun (壽春郡夫人)

Grand empress dowager of the Southern Song dynasty
- Tenure: 15 August 1274 – 4 February 1276

Empress dowager of the Southern Song dynasty
- Tenure: 17 November 1264 – 15 August 1274

Empress consort of the Southern Song dynasty
- Tenure: 14 January 1231 – 17 November 1264
- Predecessor: Empress Gongsheng
- Successor: Empress Quan
- Born: 1210; Tiantai, Zhejiang, China
- Died: 1283 (aged 72–73); Dadu, Hebei, China
- Spouse: Emperor Lizong of Song
- Issue: Zhao Wei, Prince Qichongzhao; Emperor Duzong of Song (adopted)
- Father: Zie Qubo, Prince of Wei

Xie Daoqing (謝道清; 1210 – 1283) was a Chinese empress consort of the Song dynasty, married to Emperor Lizong of Song. She was the regent of Southern Song China for Emperor Duzong in 1264, and for Emperor Gong of Song in 1274–1276.

== Life ==
Xie Daoqing came from a family of court officials: she was the daughter of Xie Qubo, Prince of Wei, and granddaughter of: Xie Shenfu, Prince Huizhen of Lü. She was selected as the spouse and empress of Emperor Lizong of Song by the Empress Yang (Song dynasty). She had no surviving son, and her spouse was succeeded by his nephew, Emperor Duzong, in 1264. Furthermore, she briefly acted as regent in that year.

=== Regent ===
In 1274, Emperor Duzong died. His four-year-old son Zhao Xian was enthroned as Emperor Gong of Song with the assistance of chancellor Jia Sidao. The following year, Gong became regent under the regency of his adoptive grandmother, Grand Empress Dowager Xie (謝太皇太后) and, nominally, his mother Empress Dowager Quan (全太后).

In this period, the army of the Mongol Empire had already taken control of the northern and south western areas of China, crossed the Yangtze River acquiring key strategic locations on the way including control of Xiangyang City (part of modern Xiangfan, Hubei), and were heading towards the Song capital at Lin'an (modern Hangzhou, Zhejiang Province). Grand Empress Dowager Xie pursued a dual solution: on the one hand ordering the people to rally behind their emperor and save the country, and on the other suing for peace with the advancing Mongols.

In early 1275, Jia Sidao led an army of 30,000 Song troops and engaged the Mongols at Wuhu City in Anhui. The Song army suffered defeat and not long afterward, bowing to public pressure, the empress dowager ordered Jia Sidao's execution. By the middle of 1275 the Mongol army had control of most of Jiandong (江東), the southern part of modern-day Jiangsu Province. On the 18th of January 1276, the leader of the Mongol forces, General Bayan arrived outside Lin'an with his army. The Song court dispatched statesman Lu Xiufu (陸秀夫) to negotiate. The envoy was left with no option other than to surrender to the Mongols.

=== Fall of Song dynasty ===
Later the same year, in February 1276, Grand Empress Dowager Xie carried the five-year-old emperor out of Lin'an and into the Mongol camp, where she too surrendered. The remnants of the Southern Song court and army who were still able to fight withdrew southwards to Fujian and Guangdong.

The former child emperor, his mother and the Imperial princesses were taken to Beijing to formally submit to the Mongols, and from there to the summer residence of the Yuan emperor in Inner Mongolia, where Empress Dowager Xie joined them a few months later. They were all stripped of their titles, but were awarded tax-free property in Beijing, where they settled.

== Notes ==
Chinese royalty
Preceded by Empress Gongsheng	Empress of China; 1231–1264	Succeeded by Empress Quan (Song dynasty)
