= Emperor Gong of Song =

Emperor of China from 1274 to 1276

Emperor Gong of Song 宋恭帝
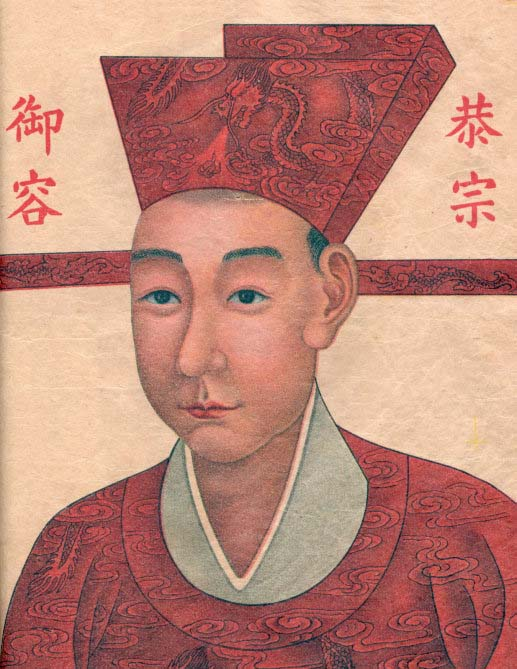

Emperor of the Song dynasty
- Reign: 12 August 1274 – 4 February 1276
- Coronation: 12 August 1274
- Predecessor: Emperor Duzong
- Successor: Emperor Duanzong
- Regent: Grand Empress Dowager Xie; Empress Dowager Quan; Jia Sidao

Duke of Ying
- Reign: 4 February 1276 – 31 May 1323
- Born: Zhao Xian; 2 November 1271; Lin'an, Zhejiang, Song China
- Died: 1323 (aged 51–52); Hexi, Gansu, Yuan China
- Consorts: Lady Borjigin (m. 1276)
- Issue: Zhao Wanpu
Era dates
- Deyou (德祐; 1275–1276)
Regnal name
- Emperor Xiaogong Yisheng (孝恭懿聖皇帝)
- House: Zhao
- Dynasty: Song (Southern Song)
- Father: Emperor Duzong
- Mother: Lady Quan

Emperor Gong of Song
- Chinese: 宋恭帝
- Literal meaning: "Respectful Emperor of the Song"
Transcriptions
Standard Mandarin
- Hanyu Pinyin: Sòng Gōng Dì

Zhao Xian
- Traditional Chinese: 趙㬎
- Simplified Chinese: 赵㬎
Transcriptions
Standard Mandarin
- Hanyu Pinyin: Zhào Xiǎn

Emperor Gong of Song (2 November 1271 – 1323), personal name Zhao Xian, was the 16th emperor of the Song dynasty of China and the seventh emperor of the Southern Song dynasty. The sixth son of his predecessor, Emperor Duzong, Zhao Xian came to the throne around the age of four, and reigned for less than two years before he was forced to abdicate in 1276. He was succeeded by his fifth brother, Zhao Shi (Emperor Duanzong).

== Reign ==
Emperor Duzong died in 1274 from a supposed overindulgence in wine. His sixth son, Zhao Xian, who was then about four years old, was enthroned as the new emperor with assistance from the chancellor Jia Sidao. In the following year, Zhao Xian's adoptive grandmother Grand Empress Dowager Xie and mother Empress Dowager Quan became regents for the child emperor, although state and military power remained under Jia Sidao's control.

By the time Zhao Xian came to the throne, the Mongol-led Yuan dynasty had already taken control of the northern and southwestern areas of China, crossed the Yangtze River and acquired key strategic locations such as Xiangyang. They were heading towards the Song capital at Lin'an (present-day Hangzhou). Grand Empress Dowager Xie pursued a dual-strategy to the pending destruction of the Song dynasty: On one hand, she ordered the people to rally behind their emperor and save the Song Empire. On the other hand, she tried to make peace with the Yuan Empire. The Yuan army advanced further and captured Song territories and took control of various prefectures along the middle stretches of the Yangtze River.

In early 1275, Jia Sidao led an army of 30,000 to engage Yuan forces at Wuhu. The Song army suffered defeat and not long afterward, bowing to public pressure, Grand Empress Dowager Xie ordered Jia Sidao's execution. However, the move came too late and the fall of the Song dynasty loomed closer.

By the middle of 1275, the Yuan army had controlled most of the Jiangdong region, the southern part of present-day Jiangsu Province. On 18 January 1276, the Yuan general Bayan showed up with his army outside Lin'an. The Song imperial court sent Lu Xiufu to negotiate for peace with the enemy, but Lu was forced to surrender. Later that year, Grand Empress Dowager Xie brought the five-year-old Zhao Xian with her to the Yuan camp to surrender.

Historian Patricia Buckley Ebrey notes that the Yuan dynasty treated the Jurchen-led Jin dynasty's Wanyan imperial family harshly, totally butchering them by the hundreds as well as the emperor of Tangut-led Western Xia dynasty when they defeated him earlier. However Ebrey also says that Yuan dynasty leaders were lenient with the Zhao imperial family of the Southern Song. Unlike the Jin dynasty in the Jingkang incident, they spared the lives of Southern Song royals in the capital Hangzhou like the Emperor Gong of Song and his mother as well as sparing the civilians inside it and not sacking the city, allowing them to go about their normal business, rehiring Southern Song officials. The Yuan dynasty did not take the Southern Song palace women for themselves but instead had Han artisans in Shangdu marry the palace women.

Remnants of the Song Empire fled southwards to Fujian and Guangdong provinces, where they continued to resist the Mongols. Zhao Xian's fifth brother, Zhao Shi, was enthroned as the new Emperor Duanzong. Zhao Shi died of illness in 1278 after fleeing the Mongols and was succeeded by his seventh brother, Zhao Bing.

In 1279, after the Battle of Yamen, Lu Xiufu brought Zhao Bing with him to Yashan (present-day Yamen, Guangdong Province), where they committed suicide by drowning themselves at sea. The death of Zhao Bing marked the end of the Song dynasty.

== Ennoblement by the Yuan dynasty ==
After the fall of the Song dynasty, Zhao Xian was relocated to the Yuan capital at Dadu (present-day Beijing) then later to Shangdu. Some sources also claim that he lived in Qianzhou (謙州; present-day Tuva, Russia). His sojourns made him one of the most well-travelled Han emperors in Chinese history.

=== Journey to the Yuan capital ===
Soon after Zhao Xian surrendered, the Yuan general Bayan urged him to travel north for an audience with the Yuan founding emperor, Kublai Khan (Emperor Shizu). As a result, in March 1276, Zhao Xian left Lin'an (present-day Hangzhou) and proceeded towards Shangdu. Grand Empress Dowager Xie remained behind due to illness so he was accompanied northwards by Empress Dowager Quan, the Lady of Long (隆國夫人; Emperor Duzong's mother), Zhao Yurui (趙與芮; Emperor Lizong's younger brother and Zhao Xian’s grandfather), Zhao Naiyou (趙乃猷), and members of the privy council Gao Yinggong (高應松) and Xie Tang (謝堂). The former emperor's entourage also included Weng Zhongde (翁仲德), Wang Yuanliang (汪元量), and other palace officials.

After they crossed the Yangtze River, two former generals, Li Tingzhi (李庭芝) and Miao Zaicheng (苗再成), planned to hijack a transport to carry them all but failed. The group arrived in Dadu in May, and then proceeded to Shangdu, where Kublai Khan received them in the Hall of Great Peace (大安殿). Kublai conferred the noble title "Duke of Ying" (瀛國公) on Zhao Xian and a princess title on Zhao Xian's ethnic Mongol wife, Lady Borjigin. Kublai Khan further ordered that Zhao Xian and Lady Borjigin be given a residence in Dadu and receive preferential treatment. In 1298, Zhao Xian was given permission to move his residence to Shangdu. Between 1314 and 1320, the Yuan ruler Emperor Renzong received the Goryeo ruler Chungseon at his court. Chungseon asked to visit Zhao Xian's residence and composed a song about him.

=== Relocation to Tibet ===
Kublai Khan wanted to preserve some vestiges of the Song imperial clan and in October 1288 issued an edict ordering Zhao Xian to relocate to Tibet. There, Zhao Xian was to study the Brahmana and Tibetan classics. Other sources claim that while in Tibet, Zhao Xian decided to study Buddhism instead. Kublai Khan's motive for this edict is unclear, as is whether such a relocation constituted a banishment. The Khan may have acted out of genuine concern for the former emperor or he may have wished to remove the Song heir to the throne out of China proper. (Note: Other male members of the Song imperial clan survived the invasion, such as Zhao Mengfu, who was a well-known painter during the Yuan dynasty, and Zhao Yiguang who lived during the Ming dynasty.) In December 1288, Zhao Xian departed from Amdo (Standard Tibetan: མདོ་སྨད, Wylie: mdo smad; Chinese: 朵思麻) in present-day Hainan Tibetan Autonomous Prefecture, for Ü-Tsang (དབུས་གཙང, Wylie: dbus gtsang; 烏思藏) within the borders of present-day Tibet. He became a resident at the Sakya Monastery and was given the dharma name "Chos kyi Rin chen" (ཆོས་ཀྱི་རིན་ཆེན་). Later on, Zhao Xian took over as the head monk at the monastery, translating Buddhist texts between the Chinese and Tibetan languages under the name "Sman rce Lha btsun" (སྨན་རྩེ་ལྷ་བཙུན་, 蠻子合尊 Mánzi Hézūn), which means "royalty of Mangi" (southern barbarian) in Tibetan language.

== Death ==
According to Sakya's monastic succession records, in 1323, the 52-year-old Zhao Xian received an imperial edict ordering him to commit suicide at Hexi (河西; present-day Zhangye, Gansu Province). Many Ming Historians believed that this was because Zhao Xian's poetry displeased the Yuan ruler, Emperor Yingzong. Other Ming historians believe that Emperor Yingzong feared a coup led by Zhao Xian. Sinologist Ann Paludan has written, "[His] unexplained suicide in 1323 led to curious rumours, including the suggestion that he was the real father of the future Mongol emperor Shundi [Toghon Temür] (1333–1368), born to a Turkish woman in 1320."

Emperor Gong’s unofficial temple name is Gongzong (恭宗)

== Family ==
Zhao Xian had one son with the Borjigin Mongol woman, Zhao Wanpu (趙完普). Zhao Xian's son Zhao Wanpu was kept alive by the Yuan dynasty because of his mother's imperial Mongol Borjigin ancestry even after Zhao Xian was killed. Instead Zhao Wanpu was only moved and exiled. The outbreak of the Song loyalist Red Turban Rebellion in Henan led to a recommendation that Zhao Wanpu should be transferred somewhere else by an Imperial Censor in 1352. The Yuan did not want the ethnic Han rebels to get their hands on Zhao Wanpu so no one was permitted to see him and Zhao Wanpu's family and himself were exiled to Shazhou near the border by the Yuan emperor. Paul Pelliot and John Andrew Boyle commented on Rashid-al-Din Hamadani's chapter The Successors of Genghis Khan in his work Jami' al-tawarikh, identified references by Rashid al-Din to Zhao Xian in his book where he mentions a Chinese ruler who was an "emir" and son-in-law to the Qan (Khan) after being removed from his throne by the Yuan Empire and he is also called "Monarch of Song", or Suju (宋主, Songzhu) in the book.

According to a Ming story Zhao Xian had an affair with Yuan empress Mailaiti, a descendant of Arslan Khan of the Karluks, a wife of Yuan Emperor Mingzong. Zhao Xian allegedly fathered Yuan Emperor Huizong with Mailaiti. The Mongols circulated a similar story about the Yongle Emperor.

== See also ==
- Chinese emperors family tree (middle)
- List of emperors of the Song dynasty
- Architecture of the Song dynasty
- Culture of the Song dynasty
- Economy of the Song dynasty
- History of the Song dynasty
- Society of the Song dynasty
- Technology of the Song dynasty

== Notes ==
Emperor Gong of Song House of Zhao Born: 1271 Died: unknown (possibly 1323)
Regnal titles
Preceded by Emperor Duzong	Emperor of the Song dynasty 1274–1276	Succeeded by Emperor Duanzong
