= Tu Huo Qiang =

Chinese weapon

Tu Huo Qiang (Chinese: 突火枪; Pinyin: tūhuǒqiāng) was a precursor to guns invented in the 1250s. It consisted of a moso bamboo tube which had been partially hollowed out and loaded with gunpowder and a single projectile, called the zi kē (子窠). In the 1950s, Chinese historian Fiang Jiasheng first posited it as evidence of the first "occlusive bullet", whereby a "pellet wad" occluded the barrel.

== See also ==
- Wujing Zongyao
- Huolongjing
