= Empress Quan (Song dynasty) =

Quan Jiu 全玖

Empress consort of the Southern Song dynasty
- Tenure: 10 February 1267 – 15 August 1274
- Predecessor: Empress Xie Daoqing

Empress dowager of the Southern Song dynasty
- Tenure: 15 August 1274 – 4 February 1276
- Born: 1241; Kuaiji, Zhejiang, China
- Died: 1309 (aged c. 68); Dadu, Hebei, China
- Spouse: Emperor Duzong
- Issue: Zhao Shu; Zhao Xian

Empress Quan (1241–1309) (Chinese: 全皇后), was a Chinese empress consort of the Song dynasty, married to Emperor Duzong of Song.

== Life ==
Quan was selected to be the primary spouse and empress of the future Emperor Duzong of Song in 1261, because of family connections (she was the great niece of emperor Lizong's mother). She gave birth to two sons, one of whom died early, and the other one, the future Emperor Gong of Song, was named heir to the throne and crown prince. Not much is known of Empress Quan during the reign of her spouse. The Emperor indulged in personal pleasure and trusted the affairs of state to his grand chancellor Jia Sidao.

In August 1274, Emperor Duzong died one month after the Mongol invasion of China, and her son succeeded to the throne as emperor. Being four years old, a regency was appointed to handle the affairs of state, but Empress Quan was not appointed regent: instead, the position of regent was filled by the adoptive mother of her late spouse, the Grand Dowager Empress Xie Daoqing, while Jia Sidao continued to manage the affairs. As the Mongol invasion progressed, Empress Quan accompanied her son, the Dowager Empress regent and the rest of the Imperial family and court in the evacuation to the south.

=== After the Mongol conquest ===
On February 1276, the Song dynasty capitulated to the Mongols at Lin'an, and the Regent Empress Xie Daoqing surrendered herself and the child emperor Gong, the son of Quan, as well as the rest of the Imperial family and court to the Mongols. Empress Quan the accompanied her son the former emperor and the Imperial princesses and concubines to the Mongolian capital of Beijing where they all formally submitted to the Mongol emperor. The Grand Empress Dowager, however, did not join them until a few months later. From Beijing, the continued to the Yuan Mongol emperor's summer residence in Inner Mongolia, where they were welcomed with a grand banquet and stripped from their Song titles. They were however awarded with tax-free properties in Beijing, where they settled the following years.

When the former Grand Dowager Empress Xie Daoqing died in 1283, the former Empress Quan entered the Zhengzhi nunnery in Beijing.

== Notes ==
- Lily Xiao Hong Lee, Sue Wiles: Biographical Dictionary of Chinese Women, Volume II: Tang Through Ming 618 - 1644

Chinese royalty
Preceded by Empress Xie Daoqing	Empress of China; 1267–1274	Succeeded by Chabi
