= Jia Sidao =

Chinese politician (1213–1275)

Jia Sidao 賈似道

Grand Chancellor of the Song Dynasty
- In office May 27, 1260 – March 27, 1275
- Monarchs: Emperor Lizong; Emperor Duzong; Emperor Gong
- Preceded by: Ding Daquan
- Succeeded by: Wen Tianxiang & Chen Yizhong

Personal details
- Born: August 25, 1213 Taizhou, Southern Song
- Died: October 1275 (aged 62) Zhangzhou, Southern Song
- Relations: Consort Jia (sister)
- Parents: Jia She (father); Lady Hu (mother)
- Occupation: Politician
- Nickname: Shixian (師憲)

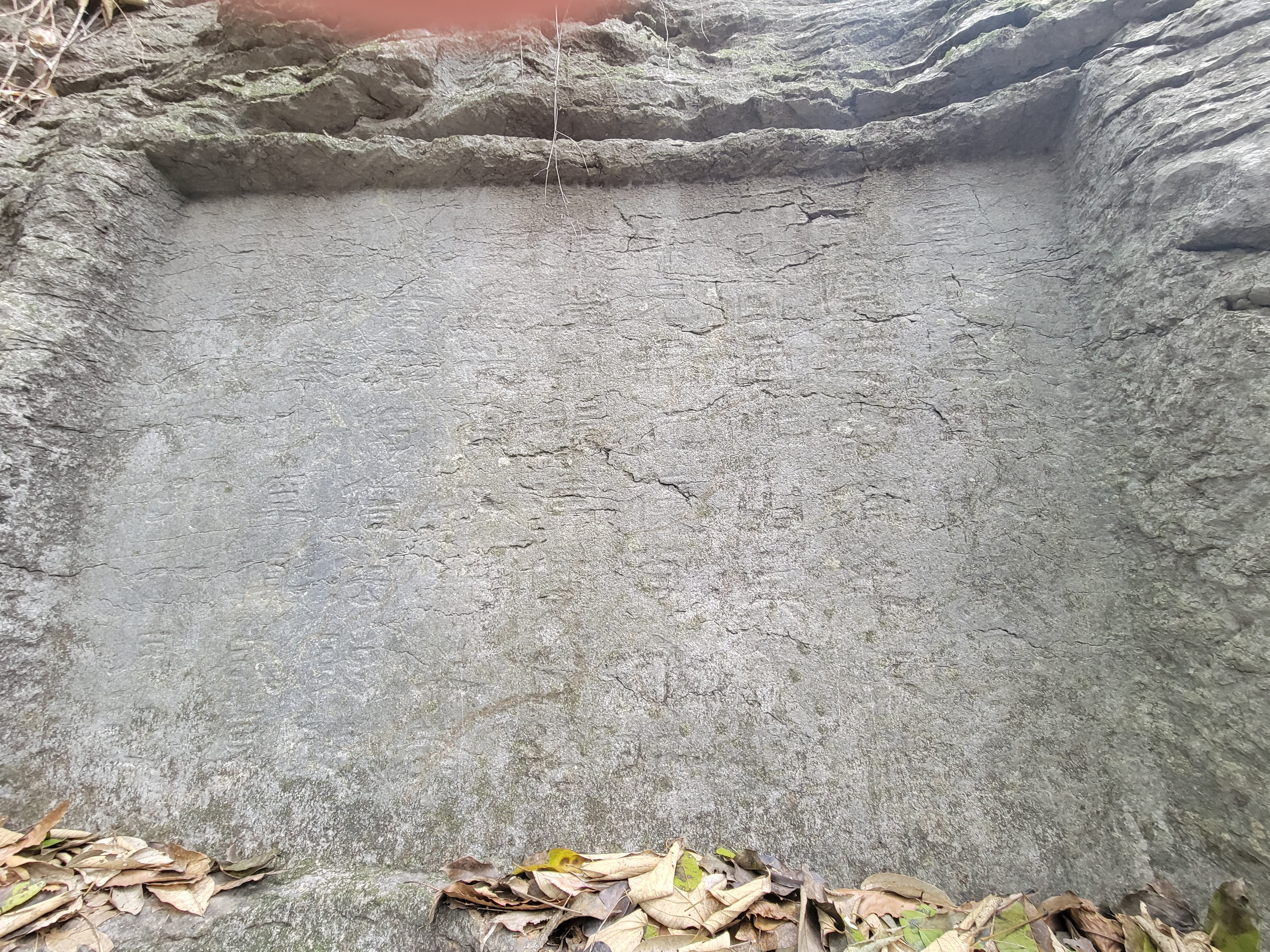
Inscription by Jia Sidao and his friends on Lianhua Peak, Near the Lingyin Temple, Hangzhou. The inscription's content says: On the day of the full moon of the tenth month of the Year Dingmao of Xianchun (Autumn 1267), Jia Sidao came to the Lingyin temple for his annual prayer service. Accompanied by Wu Zicong, Shu Yuanzhe, Qiu Fuheng, Yu Xin, Liao Yinzhong, Zhang Ru, Huang Gongshao, and Wang Ting. His son Desheng and grandson Fanshi escorted him. Monk Fazhao, Dening, Shiju and Miaoning also attended this event.

Jia Sidao (August 25, 1213 – October 1275), courtesy name Shixian, was a Chinese government official who served as chancellor of the Southern Song dynasty of China. He was the younger brother of a concubine of Emperor Lizong, who had the special favor of Emperor Duzong. Jia Sidao took part in a land nationalization program in the 1260s and was involved during the Mongol conquest, especially during the Battle of Xiangyang and the siege of Ezhou. He was assassinated by a Song dynasty court-designated sheriff charged with his custody in 1275. In Chinese history, his reputation is on par with Qin Hui's.

== Early life ==
Jia Sidao was born in 1213, to Jia She and Lady Hu; Hu was a renounced concubine of Jia She. Jia She died when Jia Sidao was 11. By the time he earned his jinshi at the age of 25 in 1238 AD, his elder sister was already a concubine of the Emperor Lizong with the rank of guifei.

== Career ==
Jia Sidao was a chancellor from 1260 to 1273 during the late Song dynasty of China. According to History of Song, he is reported to have risen to the rank of chancellor because his sister, Lady Jia, was a favored concubine of the Emperor Lizong.

Jia is best known for his intervention in the Battle of Xiangyang, where he hid the true situation (Xiangyang was under heavy attack from the Mongols and would almost certainly fall without reinforcements) from the Song court. During the Mongol invasion, there was intense political infighting among Song generals, with Jia Sidao and members of the Lü Wenhuan's family actively opposing the Song general Li Tingzhi.

Jia enjoyed the special favor of the Emperor Duzong. Being Jia's junior by 27 years, the Emperor used to stand up upon his entrance, called him "teacher" (though Jia was not an imperial degree holder, and never held such a formal post), and is said to have knelt in tears on one occasion, begging Jia Sidao to remain in office.

Jia pioneered a policy of land nationalization highly unpopular among the Confucians, who favored low taxes and a small role for the state. The land survey, endorsed by several other officials, was undertaken ca. 1262. It was driven by pressing military needs, and by rampant concentration of land in the hands of powerful landlords, who were often high-ranking court officials. In 1263, the gongtian (公田, "public field," a northern Song feature) system was re-introduced, whereby the amount of land held by individuals was restricted, and the excess land being classified as gongtian. The income from gongtian was then used to supplement military expenditure; this system functioned for the next 12 years. Jia's land reform activities went even further than those undertaken by Wang Mang during the Han dynasty, as under Wang Mang, the state monopolized only 1/3 of the excess land holdings, and at least provided some minimal compensation. In contrast, Jia's reforms offered no compensation; another of Jia's aims was to abolish the hedi policy, and reduce the amount of paper money in circulation, as under the hedi policy, with the government purchasing more grain, they had to issue more paper money, resulting in rising inflation.

During the siege of Ezhou, Jia Sidao's offer to Kublai Khan to partition China was rejected, however due to Mongke's failure of the Yunnan campaign, and a redirection of massive troops to the Ezhou frontier, Kublai decided to offer Jia Sidao a deal that he would return to Karakorum for his kurultai due to the succession dispute with Ariq Böke.

Later, at the Battle of Yihu, Jia Sidao, while leading an army of 130,000, panicked and escaped the battlefield in a small boat. The troops, seeing that their commander had abandoned them, retreated hastily; the result was a defeat whereby the remnants of the Song army were routed, allowing the Mongols to advance on the capital, Lin'an. As a result of this defeat, Jia Sidao was demoted from the post of chancellor.

=== Death ===
The possibility of executing Jia Sidao for his court failures was hotly debated in Lin'an (now Hangzhou) on the verge of its fall. Dowager Empress Xie objected to this as a cruelty, but issued progressively severe decrees of banishment and property confiscation that included Jia Sidao and his family under the pressure of the public. Ultimately, in 1275, Jia Sidao was assassinated by a court-designated sheriff, Zheng Huchen (郑虎臣), who had been charged with his custody. Whether the execution was court-sanctioned remains unclear.

== See also ==
- Song dynasty
- Song-Yuan wars
