= Emperor Duzong =

Emperor of Song China from 1264 to 1274

Emperor Duzong of Song 宋度宗
- Palace portrait on a hanging scroll, kept in the National Palace Museum, Taipei, Taiwan

Emperor of the Song dynasty
- Reign: 16 November 1264 – 12 August 1274
- Coronation: 16 November 1264
- Predecessor: Emperor Lizong
- Successor: Emperor Gong
- Born: Zhao Mengqi (1240–1251); Zhao Zi (1251–1253); Zhao Qi (1253–1274); 2 May 1240; Shaoxing, Song dynasty
- Died: 12 August 1274 (aged 34); Lin'an, Song dynasty (modern Hangzhou, Zhejiang, China)
- Burial: Yongshao Mausoleum (永紹陵, in present-day Shaoxing, Zhejiang)
- Consorts: Lady Quan (m. 1261–1274) Lady Yang (before 1274)
- Issue Detail: Emperor Duanzong; Emperor Gong; Zhao Bing
Era dates
- Xianchun (咸淳; 1265–1274)
Posthumous name
- Emperor Duanwen Mingwu Jingxiao (端文明武景孝皇帝)
Temple name
- Duzong (度宗)
- House: Zhao
- Dynasty: Song (Southern Song)
- Father: Zhao Yurui
- Mother: Huang Dingxi

Emperor Duzong of Song
- Chinese: 宋度宗
- Literal meaning: "Measured Ancestor of the Song"
Transcriptions
Standard Mandarin
- Hanyu Pinyin: Sòng Dùzōng
- Wade–Giles: Sung Tutsung

Zhao Qi
- Traditional Chinese: 趙禥
- Simplified Chinese: 赵禥
Transcriptions
Standard Mandarin
- Hanyu Pinyin: Zhào Qí

Zhao Mengqi
- Traditional Chinese: 趙孟啟
- Simplified Chinese: 赵孟启
Transcriptions
Standard Mandarin
- Hanyu Pinyin: Zhào Mèngqǐ

Zhao Zi
- Traditional Chinese: 趙孜
- Simplified Chinese: 赵孜
Transcriptions
Standard Mandarin
- Hanyu Pinyin: Zhào Zī

Emperor Duzong of Song (2 May 1240 – 12 August 1274), personal name Zhao Qi, was the 15th emperor of the Song dynasty of China and the sixth emperor of the Southern Song dynasty. He was a nephew of his predecessor, Emperor Lizong, and reigned from 1264 until his death in 1274.

His birth name was Zhao Mengqi but his name was changed to Zhao Zi in 1251 and finally to Zhao Qi in 1253 after he was designated as Emperor Lizong's heir apparent. Duzong's reign was filled with rebellions and warfare; the court was dominated by his chancellor Jia Sidao and Duzong himself gave in to drinking and women, thus abandoning his duties. He died in 1274 leaving behind three young boys, one of whom took the throne as Emperor Gong. He was the last Emperor of the Song to issue coins; subsequent Song emperors were too busy fighting the newly proclaimed Yuan dynasty to establish mints to cast any coins and did not have enough resources.

== Early life ==
Despite his mother's attempt to induce an abortion (thinking herself of low social status), Duzong was born in 1224 and would later be named heir to the Song dynasty throne. The drugs his mother took as a method of attempted abortion affected his development, impacting his intelligence, speech (allegedly he could not speak until 7 years of age), and his hands and feet had deformities and were awkward to use. He was Yurui's only son. Like his uncle Zhao Yun, he lived in Shaoxing.

=== Discovery ===
Duzong was discovered by his paternal uncle Zhao Yun, better known as Emperor Lizong in 1253, who was sonless and therefore had no heirs so to compensate, adopted Duzong and designated him crown prince in 1260, an action historians still view as confusing. Emperor Lizong died in 1264 and Emperor Duzong then ascended the throne.

== Reign ==
Emperor Duzong's reign was plagued with rebellions, warfare and corruption in his court; many officials accused the chancellor Jia Sidao of corruption but Duzong trusted Jia Sidao whom Duzong honoured by bowing down to Jia, even calling him "teacher" and according to anecdotes, when Jia was considering resigning, Duzong knelt down in tears begging Jia to remain in office.

Emperor Duzong ignored his duties and instead delegated all state and military affairs to the hands of Jia Sidao; the emperor instead indulged in drinking, women, and lived in opulence. To make things even worse, Duzong’s intelligence was lower than a normal person and he was often depressed. At first, he told the officials to be straightforward and tell him the problems in the countries, but this was all an act. Soon, he completely neglected his duties. Furthermore, he had a very high sexual appetite. Under Song laws, any woman who had sexual relations with the emperor had to pay respects to the emperor every morning. At one point, there were as many as 30 women paying their respects to Emperor Duzong in one morning. Duzong also gave official documents to four of his most favored women.

=== Mongol Invasion ===
The Mongols had spent decades harassing the Song Empire's borders and were on the verge of conquering the whole of China. Emperor Duzong however, ignored this problem instead choosing to drink and indulging in sex because when Duzong heard that Xiangyang was being besieged by Mongol troops, Duzong asked Jia Sidao "I hear that Xiangyang had been besieged by the Yuan troops for several years. Is this true?" in which Jia said in all seriousness "Well, I haven't heard such a thing." Duzong replied with "A palace maid told me this."

==== Siege of Xiangyang ====
Lu Wenhuan sent a messenger to Emperor Duzong, to request immediate reinforcements to defend Xiangyang. The messenger successfully got by the Yuan forts and reached the emperor but upon hearing the effectiveness of these new trebuchets, the emperor considered Xiangyang lost and did not send reinforcements. The decisive Battle of Xiangyang was fought in 1274 when the Mongols succeeded in capturing and destroying the last Song stronghold. The loss of Xiangyang sealed the fate of the Song dynasty and the news of its capture was deliberately hidden from Emperor Duzong by Jia Sidao.

=== Death ===
Reports are disputed over how the Emperor died. Some say that he died from overindulgence in wine. But Historian Richard L. Davis and other sources claim that Duzong died suddenly from a severe negligence of a Palace Doctor. In any case, he was succeeded by his sixth son, Zhao Xian (Emperor Gong), who was then only four years old. Although Emperor Duzong was technically not the last emperor of the Song dynasty, historians see him as the last Song emperor who could have made decisions that would've significantly halted or even prevented the fall of the dynasty, as Gong was forced to abdicate two years later at the age of 6. His reign ended with Chancellor Jia Sidao's execution, but the collapse of the Song dynasty was inevitable as the Mongols drew closer.

Emperor Duzong was buried in the Yongshao Mausoleum on January 1275.

== Family ==
- Empress, of the Quan clan (皇后 全氏; 1241–1309), second cousin
  - Zhao Shu (趙舒; 1264), second son
  - Zhao Xian, Emperor Xiaogong (孝恭皇帝 趙㬎; 1271–1323), sixth son
- Pure Consort, of the Yang clan (淑妃 楊氏; d. 1279), personal name Juliang (巨良)
  - Zhao Huang, Prince Chongjing of Qi (岐衝靖王 趙鍠; b. 1268), fourth son
  - Zhao Shi, Duanzong (端宗 趙是; 1269–1278), fifth son
  - Princess (公主)
    - Married Jiang Rixin (江日新)
  - Princess Jin (晉公主)
- Xiurong, of the Yu clan (修容 俞氏)
  - Zhao Xian, Duke Chongding of Yi (益衝定公 趙憲; 1268–1270), third son
  - Princess Xin'an Zhuangyi (信安莊懿公主), first daughter
    - Married Fang Daosheng (方道盛)
  - Princess Zhenjing (貞靜公主), personal name Guangyi (光懿)
    - Married Huang Cai (黃材)
  - Zhao Bing, Emperor (皇帝 趙昺; 1272–1279), seventh son
- Zhaoyi, of the Wang clan (王昭仪), personal name Qinghui (清惠)
- Furen, of the Zhu clan (朱人 夫氏, d. 1276)
- Unknown
  - Zhao Chao, Prince Chongshan of Guang (廣衝善王 趙焯; 1262–1263), first son

== See also ==
- Chinese emperors family tree (middle)
- Architecture of the Song dynasty
- Culture of the Song dynasty
- Economy of the Song dynasty
- History of the Song dynasty
- Society of the Song dynasty
- Technology of the Song dynasty

Emperor Duzong House of Zhao Born: 1240 Died: 1274
Regnal titles
Preceded by Emperor Lizong	Emperor of the Song dynasty 1264–1274	Succeeded by Emperor Gong
