= Sichuan anti-Mongol fortresses =

Defensive fortresses in the Southern Song dynasty

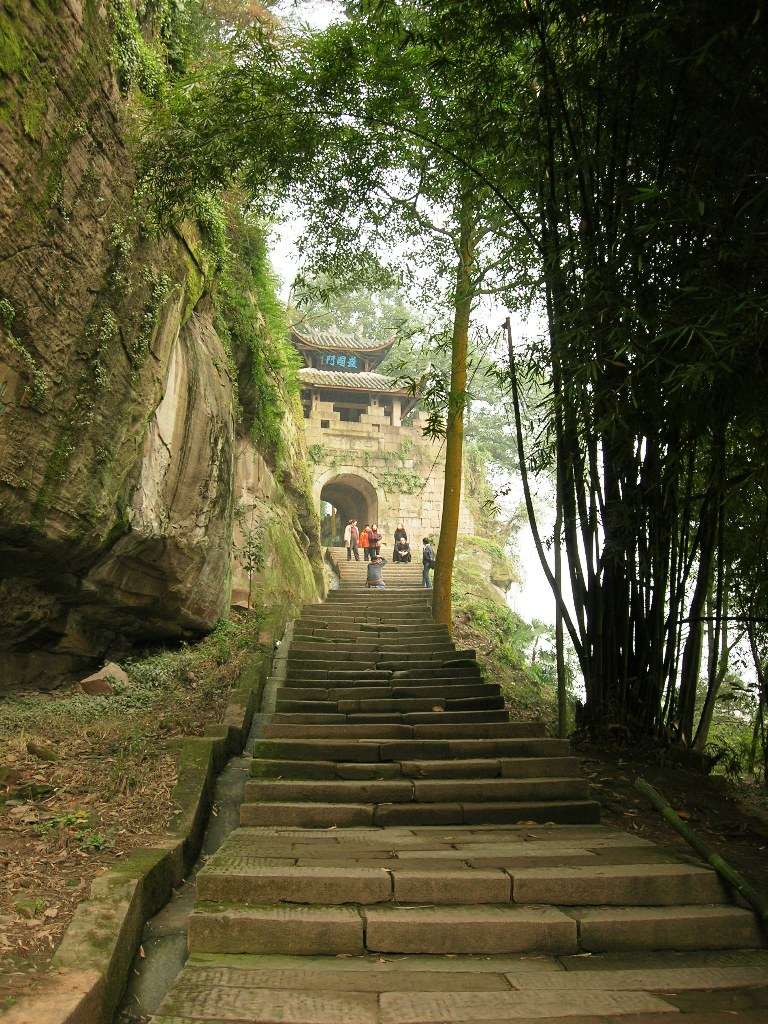
A staircase towards Diaoyucheng, one of the 48 fortresses that defended Southern Song from the Mongol Empire

The Sichuan anti-Mongol fortresses are 83 mountain cities built by the soldiers and civilians of the Southern Song Dynasty during the Mongol conquest of China in Sichuan to resist the invasion of the Mongol Empire. Taking full advantage of the geographical advantages of the Sichuan Basin, these fortresses formed a comprehensive three-dimensional defense system, which succeeded in resisting the Mongol attacks for up to 53 years, greatly extending the life of Southern Song. They also made Sichuan the last to be conquered by the Mongolians in 1288. Due to the defense of the fortresses, it was difficult to settle the Sichuan region. The Mongol Army had to abort its original strategy of "taking Shu (Sichuan) and destroying Song" and moved to the area of Jingzhou and Xiangyang starting from 1271, defeating the Song Dynasty via the Han River. Möngke Khan became the only Mongol khagan to perish on the battlefield when he died during an assault on Diaoyucheng in 1259. He may have been a victim of dysentery or of injuries sustained when attacking the fortress.

At present, there are still 48 fortresses kept to this date from the Song Dynasty in Sichuan and Chongqing. Among them, five of them (including Diaoyucheng and Baidicheng) were recognized as Major Historical and Cultural Sites Protected at the National Level. Another 14 of the fortresses were selected as major historical and cultural sites protected by Sichuan Province and Chongqing. But overall, except for a select few such as Diaoyucheng, most of them have not been effectively protected or developed.

== History ==
The Sino-Mongol wars in Sichuan began in 1227, known as the 1227 incident or the Dinghai incident. The Mongolian army attacked Western Xia while sending troops into Sichuan, and captured five prefectures belonging to Lizhou Circuit near Sichuan. In 1236, Kashin, the second son of Ögedei Khan, led the Mongolian army to the south of Sichuan, breaking through the Song defense line at Kaizhou, Lizhou Circuit, and entered the Sichuan Basin. Three circuits in Sichuan were almost completely occupied except Kuizhou Circuit, and the Song only kept a few states such as Luzhou, Guo prefecture, and Hezhou. After this, the Mongolian army continued to invade Sichuan. In 1241, it took Chengdu again, nearing Kuizhou, and the Sichuan defense line was nearly destroyed. In 1241, Yu Jie moved the military and political center of Sichuan from Chengdu to Chongqing, which was easier to defend. After understanding that defending on flat land failed to stop the Mongol army, Yu began to build a mountain defense system and relocated the state government offices in the Sichuan province into the Daba Mountains. Most of the fortresses were located near cliffs of the mountains. The top of the mountains were wide and flat, there was enough arable land and water, so they were self-sufficient and could be defended for a long time. At the same time, the mountain cities were often connected by rivers and roads at the junction of valleys or rivers. The defense of the Southern Song Dynasty used Chongqing, Jiading and Kuimen as the centers of the defense of Sichuan, which resisted the invasion of Mongolia for 53 years. Even after the Battle of Yamen in 1279, which ended the Southern Song dynasty, two of the fortresses (Santaicheng and Lingxiaocheng) had not fallen. The former lasted for an extra year until 1280, and the latter lasted until 1288, making it the last place under Song control.

== List ==
List of fortresses
Name	Year of construction	Year of downfall	Original Circuit	Original Zhou or Fu	Current location	Protection level	Image	Location
Sanguicheng (三龟城)	1243	1275	Chengdufu	Jiading Fu	Shizhong District, Leshan	protected by Leshan		
Jiudingcheng (九顶城)	1243	1275	Chengdufu	Jiading Fu	Shizhong District, Leshan	protected by Leshan		
Ziyuncheng (紫云城)	1243	1275	Chengdufu	Jiading Fu	Qianwei County, Leshan			
Qingxicheng (清溪城)			Chengdufu	Jiading Fu	Muchuan County, Leshan			
Baiyanzhai (白岩寨)			Chengdufu	Jiading Fu	Muchuan County, Leshan			
Diaoyucheng (钓鱼城)	1240	1279	Tongchuanfu	Hezhou	Hechuan District, Chongqing	protected at the national level		
Shenbicheng (神臂城)	1243	1277	Tongchuanfu	Luzhou	Hejiang County, Luzhou	protected at the national level		
Yundingcheng (云顶城)	1243	1266	Tongchuanfu	Huai'an Jun	Jintang County, Chengdu	protected by Sichuan Province		
Qingjucheng (青居城)	1249	1258	Tongchuanfu	Shunqing Fu	Gaoping District, Nanchong	protected by Nanchong		
Yishengcheng (宜胜城)	1272	1278	Tongchuanfu	Hezhou	Hechuan District, Chongqing			
Liyicheng (礼义城)	1255	1275	Tongchuanfu	Quzhou	Qu County, Dazhou	protected by Sichuan Province		
Daliangcheng (大良城)	1243	1275	Tongchuanfu	Guang'an Jun	Qianfeng District, Guang'an			
Xiaoliangcheng (小良城)	1243	1275	Tongchuanfu	Guang'an Jun	Qianfeng District, Guang'an			
Rongcheng (荣城)			Tongchuanfu	Quzhou	Dazhu County, Dazhou			
Lingquanshancheng (灵泉山城)	1258	1258	Tongchuanfu	Suining Fu	Chuanshan District, Suining			
Zijincheng (紫金城)	1254		Tongchuanfu	Tongchuan Fu	Yanting County, Mianyang			
Tiefengcheng (铁锋城)	1243		Tongchuanfu	Puzhou	Anyue County, Ziyang			
Hutoucheng (虎头城)	1265	1275	Tongchuanfu	Fushun Jian	Fushun County, Zigong	protected by Sichuan Province		
Dadaozhai (大刀寨)	1253		Tongchuanfu	Rongzhou (Sichuan)	Rong County, Zigong			
Jishengzhai (集生砦)	1244	1258	Tongchuanfu	Rongzhou (Sichuan)	Rong County, Zigong	protected by Sichuan Province		
Wanshoushancheng (万寿山城)			Tongchuanfu	Luzhou	Lu County, Luzhou	protected by Sichuan Province		
Rongshancheng (榕山城)	1239		Tongchuanfu	Luzhou	Hejiang County, Luzhou			
Anleshancheng (安乐山城)	1240	1277	Tongchuanfu	Luzhou	Hejiang County, Luzhou			
Sanjiangqi (三江碛)	1239		Tongchuanfu	Luzhou	Jiang'an County, Yibin			
Anyuanzhai (安远寨)			Tongchuanfu	Luzhou	Jiang'an County, Yibin			
Denggaocheng	1267	1275	Tongchuanfu	Xuzhou	Cuiping District, Yibin			
Xianlucheng	1260	1275	Tongchuanfu	Xuzhou	Cuiping District, Yibin			
Lingxiaocheng	1257	1288	Tongchuanfu	Changning Jun	Xingwen County, Yibin			
Kuzhu'ai	1236	1258	Lizhou	Longqing Fu	Jiange County, Guangyuan	protected by Sichuan Province		
Changningshancheng			Lizhou	Lizhou	Jiange County, Guangyuan	protected by Guangyuan		
Edingbao		1258	Lizhou	Lizhou	Jiange County, Guangyuan			
Xiaoningcheng	1245		Lizhou	Bazhou	Pingchang County, Bazhong	protected by Sichuan Province		
Dehancheng	1249	1264	Lizhou	Bazhou	Tongjiang County, Bazhong	protected by Sichuan Province		
Pingliangcheng	1251		Lizhou	Bazhou	Bazhou District, Bazhong	protected by Sichuan Province		
Dahuocheng	1244	1258	Lizhou	Langzhou	Cangxi County, Guangyuan	protected by Sichuan Province		
Kua'aocheng	1253		Lizhou	Langzhou	Nanbu County, Nanchong			
Yunshancheng	1246	1258	Lizhou	Fengzhou	Peng'an County, Nanchong			
Baidicheng	1242	1278	Kuizhou	Kuizhou	Fengjie County, Chongqing	protected at the national level		
Tianshengcheng	1241	1276	Kuizhou	Wanzhou	Wanzhou District, Chongqing	protected at the national level		
Chongqingcheng	1240	1278	Kuizhou	Chongqing Fu	Yuzhong District, Chongqing	protected at the national level		
Duogongcheng	1243		Kuizhou	Chongqing Fu	Jiangbei District, Chongqing	protected by Chongqing		
Santaicheng	1266	1280	Kuizhou	Fuzhou	Fuling District, Chongqing			
Huanghuacheng	1265	1277	Kuizhou	Zhongzhou	Zhong County, Chongqing			
Tiancicheng	1263		Kuizhou	Daning Jian	Wushan County, Chongqing	protected by Chongqing		
Chiniucheng	1242	1276	Kuizhou	Liangshan Jun	Liangping District, Chongqing			
Longyacheng	1256	1278	Kuizhou	Nanping Jun	Nanchuan District, Chongqing	protected by Chongqing		
Shaoqingcheng	1272	1278	Kuizhou	Qinzhou	Pengshui County, Chongqing			
Panshicheng			Kuizhou	Yun'an Jun	Yunyang County, Chongqing	protected by Chongqing		
