= Huiguan =

Chinese native-place association

- Traditional Chinese: 會館
- Simplified Chinese: 会馆
- Literal meaning: assembly hall
Transcriptions
Standard Mandarin
- Hanyu Pinyin: huìguǎn
Yue: Cantonese
- Jyutping: wui6 gun2
Southern Min
- Hokkien POJ: hōe-koán
Eastern Min
- Fuzhou BUC: huôi-guāng

A huiguan is a Chinese association or association hall of sojourners or migrants from the same area. They originated in the early 1400s and were common across China and overseas during the Qing dynasty (1644–1912). Most were founded by merchants or artisans and a kind of guild, while most in Beijing lodged candidates for the imperial examinations. Huiguan had social, religious, and philanthropic purposes such as temples, cemeteries, banquets, and theatrical performances. They worked to maintain order in their communities and represent their interests to the government and public, with some functioning like governments. A huiguan could represent an area ranging from a county to multiple provinces, and in some countries they formed federations to represent all Chinese immigrants. In China, the institutions declined in the 1900s before being dissolved in the 1950s, while some overseas are active as cultural organizations.

== History ==
=== China ===
Native place has historically been an important part of personal identity in Chinese culture. Men generally intended their relocations to be temporary, ideally returning to the place of their extended family and ancestors for marriage, mourning, retirement, and burial. Native-place identity could persist after several generations of immigration, and shared origin was the basis of extended kinship ties. Huiguan provided a community of sojourners with a familiar cultural environment for social and religious life, encouraged cooperation and self-regulation, and represented them to the public.

The first huiguan were established by government officials (Note: from Wuhu, Fuliang (near Jingdezhen), and Guangdong respectively) in Beijing during the Yongle era (1403–1424), presumably because the capital was moved from Nanjing. Earlier institutions similar to huiguan include temples dedicated to regionally-worshiped deities, government-operated lodgings such as di (邸) or huitongguan (會同館), and trade associations, but evidence of a direct connection is tenuous. The first known huiguan outside of Beijing were founded during the Jiajing era (1522–1567). They grew in number and influence through the Qing dynasty, though interrupted by the mid-1800s rebellions.

At their height around the turn of the 20th century, there were at least 532 huiguan in Beijing and at least 2,000 huiguan in 300 other Chinese cities and towns. They were more common in provinces along the Yangtze River and for those from mid-Yangtze and southeastern provinces. Amid efforts to modernize and build national identity, huiguan lost autonomy and relevance before being dissolved in the 1950s.

While huiguan in Beijing usually catered to scholar-officials and examination candidates, most elsewhere were for merchants or artisans. As particular lines of work tended to be dominated by men hailing from the same area, these huiguan primarily functioned as guilds. While the institutions were typically elite and exclusive, they also supported the interests and needs of their broader communities. In the early Republican era, a new kind of native-place association called tongxianghui (同鄉會) became popular. They represented a less-elite upper class, adopted democratic procedures, and in Shanghai and Nanjing met in secular Western-style high-rises.

==== Guilds ====
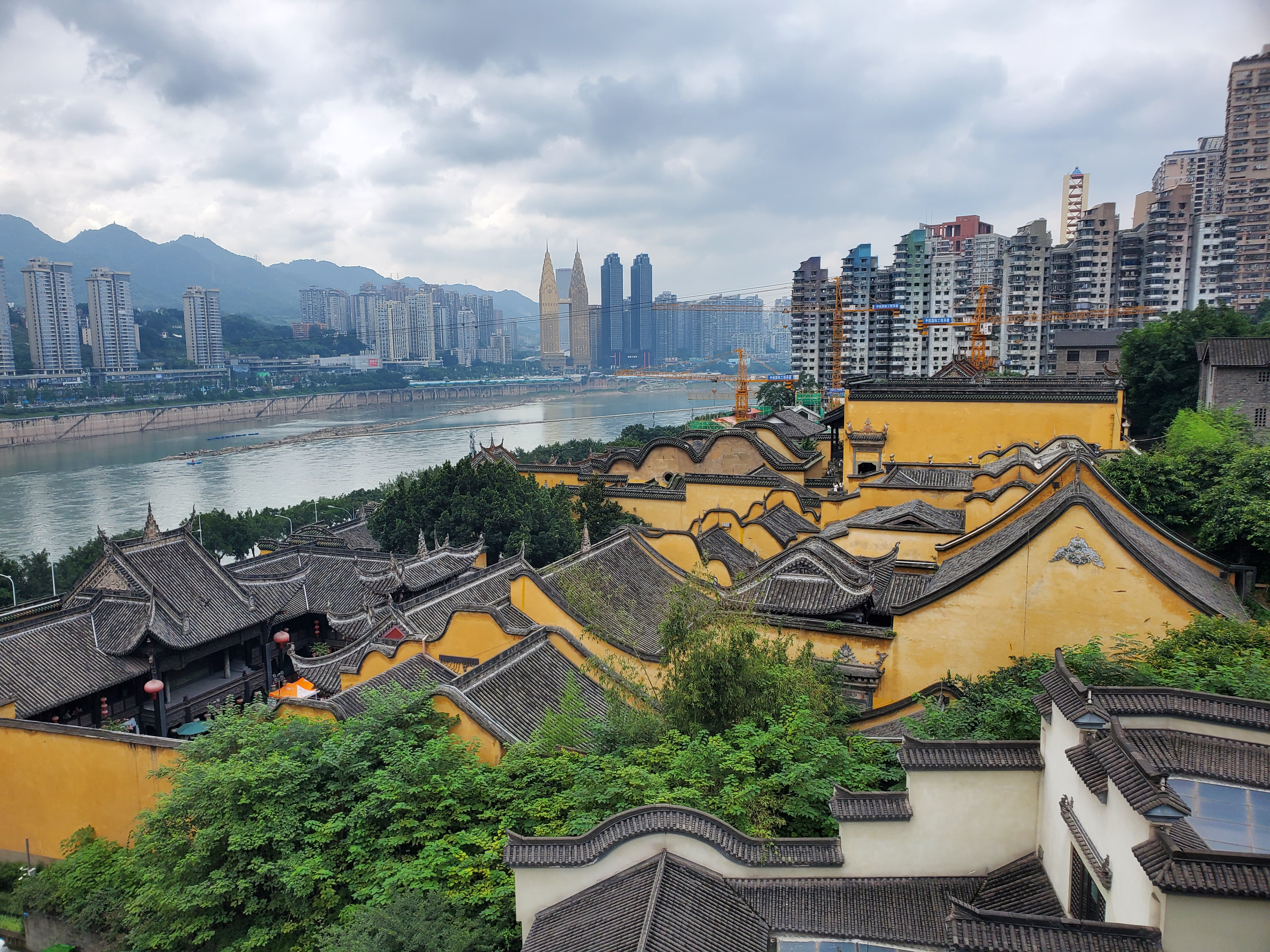
Huguang Huiguan in Chongqing, part of the Eight-Province Huiguan

Guilds spread and became more structured starting in the mid-1700s and especially in the late 1800s. Most guilds were called huiguan or gongsuo (公所; 'public halls'), often interchangeably, although gongsuo were based on common occupation. Craft guilds formed after merchant guilds and were less influential, but may have become roughly equal in number. They generally aimed to monopolize their trade, restrain competition, establish regulations, and enforce agreements, emphasizing values like solidarity, mutual aid, and integrity. Huiguan also recruited workers from their home area. Guilds typically limited workshops to training one apprentice at a time for a period of three years, while opening a workshop as a master only required entrance fees. In some cases, journeymen or workers formed separate guilds from masters or employers.

The central government did not issue regulations on guilds, only warning against "monopolistic formation of cartels" while leaving implementation to local governments. In Suzhou, guilds were closely regulated, with cases of unregistered guilds being broken up for monopolization, organizing workers against employers, enforcing donations, or redundancy. In Hankou, registration was optional and offered protection from infringements. After the mid-1800s, guilds became required to collect tariffs and provide public works (firefighting, policing, and infrastructure). In Chongqing and Hankou, guilds even took over administrative functions to become unofficial municipal governments.

Traditional guilds were superseded by chambers of commerce in the New Policies then restructured by 1927 by the Nationalist government, with some becoming labor unions. The few remaining traditional guilds were closed down with the formation of the People's Republic of China. After reform and opening up, businesspeople across various industries formed hometown-based organizations to network and share resources. They were supported by local governments and became regulated as alien merchant chambers in 2003. As of 2020, there are 462 provincial-level alien merchant chambers.

==== Beijing ====
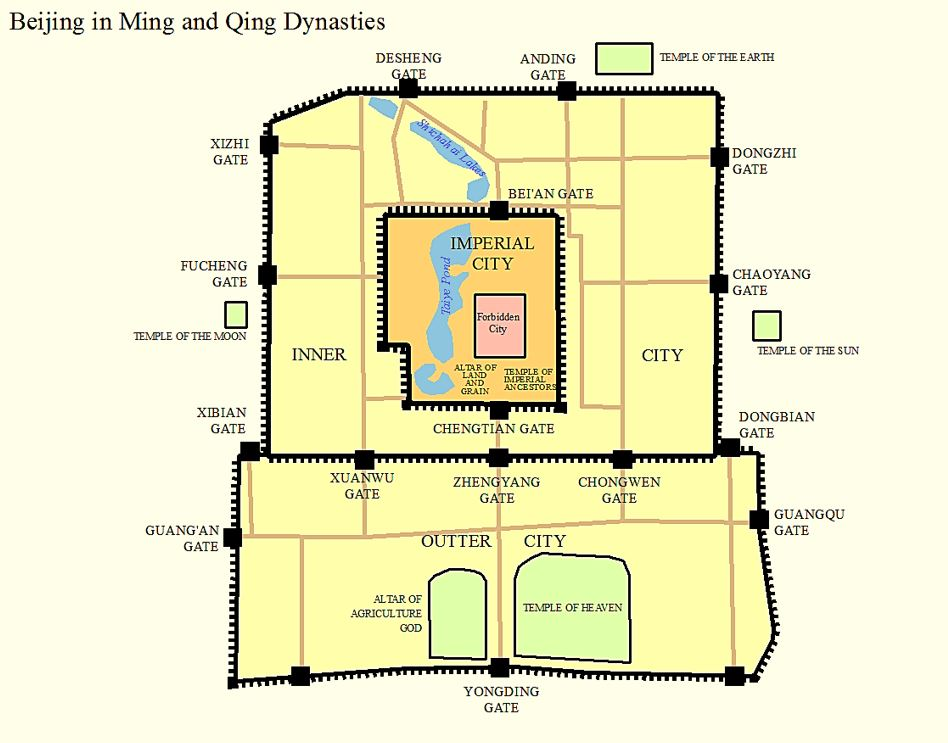
Map of Beijing in the Qing Dynasty

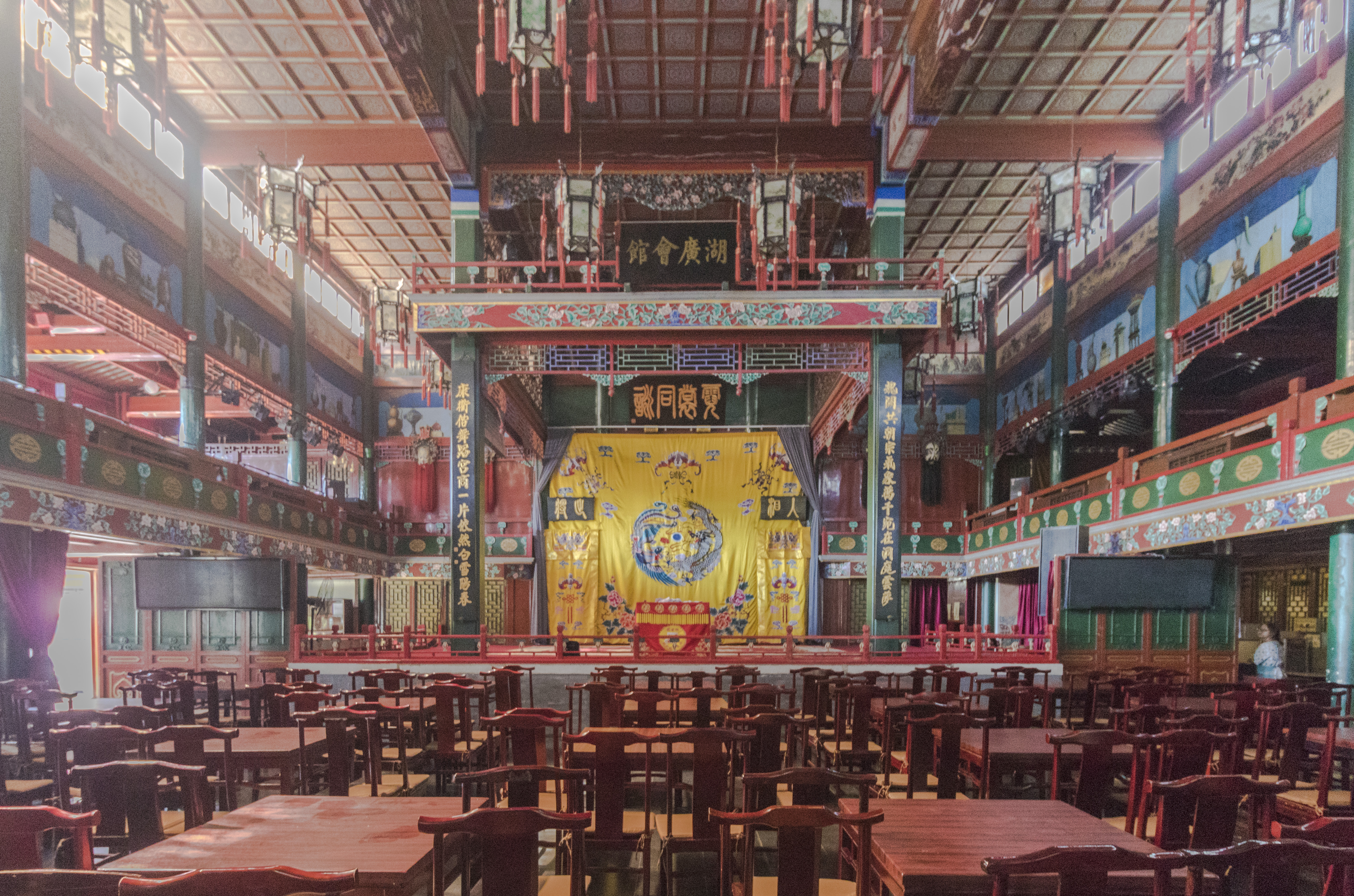
Opera stage of Huguang Huiguan in Beijing

The number of huiguan in Beijing increased rapidly through the Ming and Qing Dynasty, with 86% serving scholar-officials. At least by the late Ming, many focused on providing lodging for the two triennial imperial examinations held in Beijing. The metropolitan examination was for the jinshi degree, and Beijing's provincial-level examination for the juren degree had significantly higher pass-rates while not being restricted by province. At the beginning of the Qing dynasty, civilians were relocated to the Outer City. Scholar-official huiguan clustered outside the southern gates of the Inner City, particularly in the Xuannan area near Xuanwu Gate. In the late Qing dynasty, many provincial-level huiguan were reserved for officials or high-ranking officials, and had large opera stages and banqueting facilities for socializing and networking.

Scholar-official huiguan were an informal channel for regional interests in the capital, and their communities cooperated with the government to maintain social order. Many activities (Note: including the purchase of ranks or titles, appointments to public office, and petitions to the censorate) in the capital required an yinjie (印結; 'chopped bond') from a high-ranking metropolitan official of the same province attesting to the petitioner's background. Yinjie fees were collected and distributed to metropolitan officials of the same province, exceeding their small official salaries.

Around the turn of the 20th century, huiguan in Beijing became increasingly involved in political activity, facilitated by the concentration of scholar-officials, spacious facilities, and their history of autonomy. Kang Youwei and other key activists in the 1890s reform movement involving the Petition of the Examination Candidates and Hundred Days' Reform were closely associated with and organized in huiguan. From before the 1911 revolution to the May Fourth movement, a number of political figures gave public speeches and debates in huiguan facilities, and the Kuomintang was founded in Beijing's Huguang Huiguan. Starting in 1915, the new municipal government regulated and controlled huiguan.

Following social and political changes such as the abolishment of the imperial examination in 1905 and the movement of the capital to Nanjing in 1927, huiguan broadened in demographics and activities while declining.

==== Frontier regions ====
Jiangxi Huiguan in Ning'er, Yunnan

There were also huiguan who organized and served all people from a particular area, such as in migrations to Sichuan, Yunnan, Taiwan, Inner Mongolia, and Manchuria. They were more involved in governance: resolving disputes involving members and often policing and taxing their members in the baojia and lijia systems. These huiguan were sometimes set up by the merchants who brought the migrants there or expanded from merchant huiguan.

=== Outside China ===
As with internal migration, huiguan outside of China generally included all migrants from an area and were more involved in governance. Some federated to represent all Chinese immigrants where they operated.

==== Vietnam ====
Gate of Fujian Assembly Hall in Hoi An

Most huiguan in Vietnam are associated with Mazu temples, which were built starting in the 1600s. The community organizations known variously as bang, conǵrégations, and hoi quan became official administrative units in 1807 under Gia Long, and membership for Chinese nationals was made mandatory (Note: except those employed by European firms) in late 1800s French Indochina. The colonial government viewed overseas Chinese networks as a political threat and tightly regulated conǵrégations. Besides policing and surveilling, their elected leaders were responsible for collecting heavy poll taxes. There was widespread tax evasion and social unrest, including assassinations.

In South Vietnam, the congregation system was replaced by coercive assimilation policies. After the Fall of Saigon and rising tensions between Vietnam and China, Hoa (Chinese) cultural activities were restricted and huiguan had their assets confiscated. They became active again after the 1980s economic reforms and more accommodating ethnic policies, and some trust was built.

===== Singapore =====
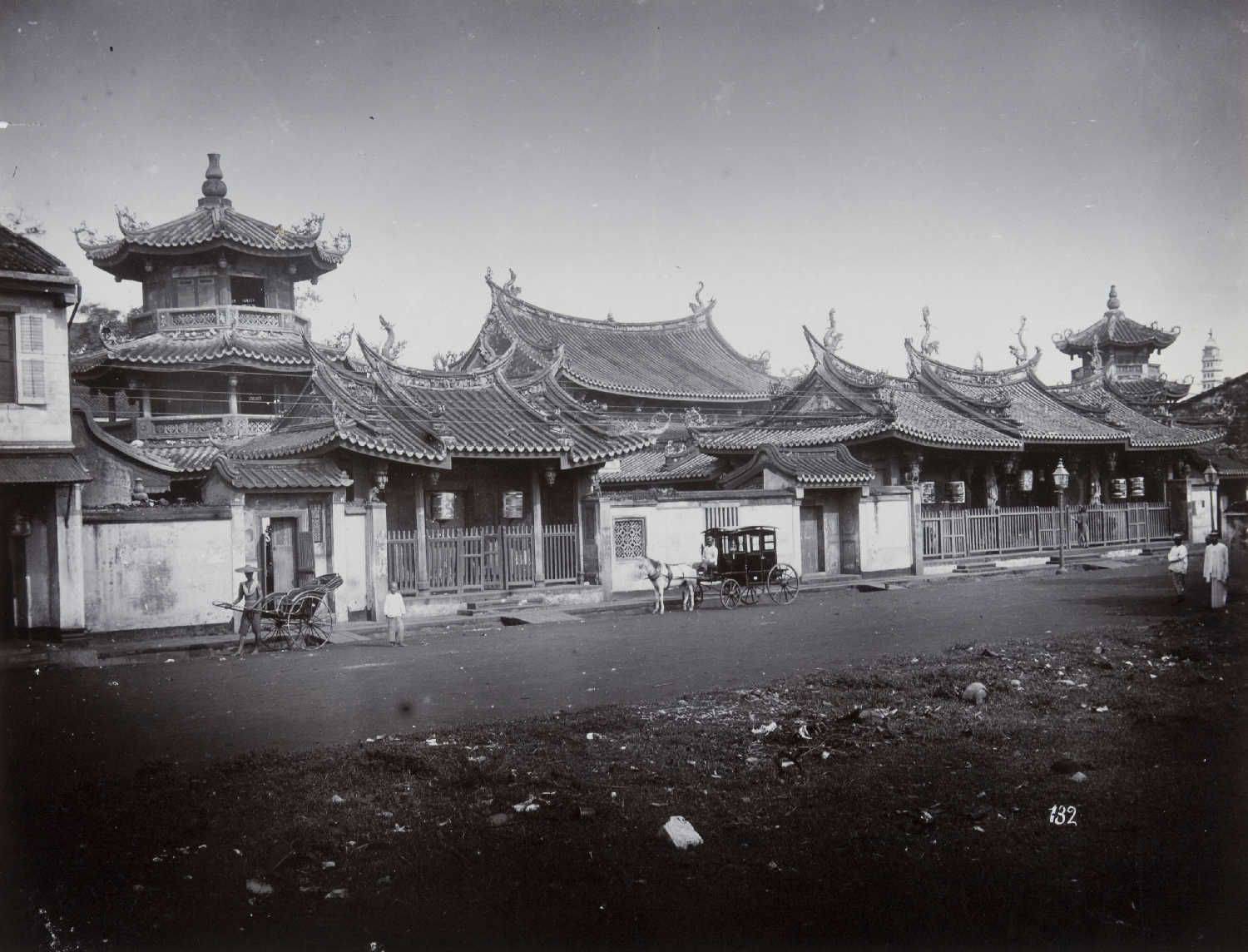
Thian Hock Keng Temple c. 1900, then the headquarters of the Singapore Hokkien Huay Kuan

In Singapore, Chinese social organization was mostly within the five major bang, dialect groups, which had all established headquarters by the mid 1800s. By the end of the 1800s there were about fifty temples, native-place institutions, clan associations, and guilds. They had a cordial relationship with the British colonial government, which relied on them for social control and formed the Chinese Protectorate and Chinese Advisory Board to represent their interests.

In the early 1900s, huiguan multiplied and went through various restructurings. Some formed confederations with their counterparts across British Malaya or Nanyang. Many secularized, and centrally-organized welfare shifted to grassroots mutual aid. Straits-born leaders were dislodged by new immigrants and there was greater attention to China-related causes. Before and during the Second Sino-Japanese War, huiguan were active in organizing boycotts for the Jinan incident and in the 1937-1941 National Salvation Movement, as well as funding reconstruction and relief for their home regions and for the war effort.

==== India ====
In Kolkata, five huiguan were founded from the 1800s and remain active despite the dispersal of the Chinese population in the late 1900s. There were also two huiguan in Jalpaiguri.

==== United States ====
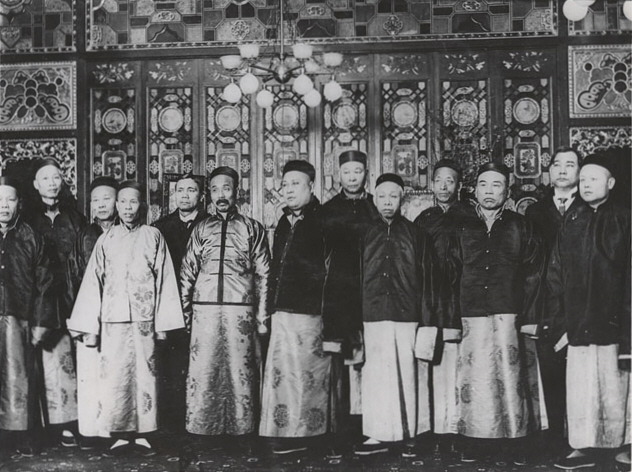
Officers of the Chinese Consolidated Benevolent Association c. 1900

In San Francisco, several huiguan for Cantonese districts had been established by the 1850s, and in 1862 they joined as the Chinese Consolidated Benevolent Association, popularly known as the Chinese Six Companies. The organizations were similar to those in China, but membership was mandatory and their focus was on providing aid. They offered loans for onward travel and required debts to be settled before return to China.

In the 1870s, competition between Chinese and white laborers led to increased anti-Chinese sentiment, which focused on the Six Companies. As the huiguan provided new arrivals with food and lodging, they were mistaken for the labor brokers who had brought them there. Their extragovernmental actions to promote order in Chinese communities were also viewed with suspicion. Newspapers accused the Six Companies of importing coolies and establishing a slave government. The associations were unsuccessful in changing public opinion, but prevailed in many legal challenges of discriminatory laws.

== Facilities ==
Small huiguan generally consisted of lodging, an altar or temple, and a meeting area. Large huiguan compounds had features like kitchens, banquet halls, opera stages, or gardens. In Beijing, grander compounds resembled siheyuan, spacious courtyard residences. In Shanghai, they were in the style of yamen and often more imposing. Their other properties could include charitable cemeteries, schools, and orphanages as well as rental properties.

=== Temples ===
Common religious worship was a defining feature of the community of a huiguan. Some compounds grew from or were closely associated with a temple. Some enshrined deities were specific to their home region such as city gods or earth gods. Others were more widely worshiped, such as Wenchang, Guandi, Mazu, or Li Bing.

=== Opera stages ===
Opera stage of Xiqin Guildhall in Zigong, Sichuan

Huiguan were major venues and organizers of opera performances. In Sichuan, at least 1,400 huiguan regularly held performances. Not all huiguan had stages, but a few were built as west as Urumuqi or for petty craftsmen. More than half of the huiguan stages in northern China were funded by Shaanxi and Shanxi merchants. One Shanxi-Shaanxi compound in Hankou had seven stages and another in Zigong cost 50,000 taels (roughly equivalent to 220 years of skilled labor). The patronage of regional operatic traditions contributed to their spread and development.

The annual huiguan meeting on the patron deity's birthday included a feast and opera performance in their honor. There were less formal occasions for performances as well. Many were open to the public and intended as moral education through mass entertainment, also building the huiguan's reputation. After the mid-Qing, the religious purpose of these opera performances became increasingly incidental relative to entertainment and socializing. The stages also came to be rented by huiguan members for personal events like birthdays, weddings, and funerals, which sometimes included opera. They later became more open to the public with commercial performances by theater troupes and other events.

=== Cemeteries ===
Many huiguan operated coffin repositories and cemeteries for the wider community of compatriots. Historically, it was only feasible for the wealthy to have their remains be transported home for burial, while charitable cemeteries could at least provide mortuary rites. Purchasing land, building and maintaining facilities, and conducting annual rituals required substantial funding and management.

Starting in the 1850s, huiguan in San Francisco funded the repatriation of remains for poor members. Tung Wah Coffin Home in Hong Kong was the largest intermediary, and received an estimated 100,000 remains from around the world in the early 1900s. Many remains were also buried locally out of circumstance or choice, and overseas Chinese cemeteries have adapted to local culture to varying degrees.

== Operation ==
Huiguan were mainly led and funded by prominent officials or merchants. The position of director could be inherited, rotate annually, or be selected by voting or lot. Important decisions might be voted on. Daily operations were delegated to hired watchmen or managers.

A huiguan could represent an area ranging from a county to multiple provinces, sometimes corresponding to a dialect group. Some huiguan were mergers or umbrella organizations of huiguan representing smaller geographic divisions.

== See also ==
- Hometown association
- Landsmanshaft
- Kongsi
