= Zhangxue Tongzui =

Chan master, poet, calligrapher, and monastic architect

- 丈雪通醉

Personal life
- Born: Li Luo; Li Weixing; 1610 Zi County, Sichuan, Ming China
- Died: 1695 (aged 84–85) Chengdu, Sichuan, Qing China
- Parent: Li Mei

Religious life
- Religion: Chan Buddhism
- School: Linji school
- Lineage: 36th generation

Senior posting
- Teacher: Poshan Haiming; Miyun Yuanwu

Chinese name
- Chinese: 丈雪通醉
Transcriptions
Standard Mandarin
- Hanyu Pinyin: Zhàngxuě Tōngzuì

Birth name
- Traditional Chinese: 李羅 or 李惟興
- Simplified Chinese: 李罗 or 李惟兴
Transcriptions
Standard Mandarin
- Hanyu Pinyin: Lǐ Luó or Lǐ Wéixīng

Zhangxue Tongzui (Chinese: 丈雪通醉; 1610 – 1695) was a eminent Chan master, poet, calligrapher, and monastic architect during the late Ming and early Qing dynasties of China. A principal Dharma successor of the renowned master Poshan Haiming, he played a pivotal role in revitalizing Chan Buddhism in southwest China, particularly in Sichuan, Guizhou, and Shaanxi.

== Biography ==
=== Early life and monastic training ===
Zhangxue Tongzui was born Li Luo or Li Weixing into a peasant family in Zi County (now Neijiang), Sichuan, to Li Mei (李梅), in 1610, during the late Ming dynasty (1368–1644). He entered monastic life at age five under his uncle Chan master Qingran (清然禅师) at Zhugu Temple (诸古寺). Well-educated in Confucian classics and Buddhist texts, he demonstrated exceptional literary and artistic talent from youth.

In 1630, Zhangxue Tongzui vowed to observe the complete precepts under Jiansui (鉴随) at Baiyun Temple. In 1634, after his father died, Zhangxue Tongzui became a disciple of Chan master Poshang Haiming, who later bestowed upon him the name "Zhangxue" (丈雪; 'Ten-Foot Snow') after witnessing his enlightenment during a waterfall meditation—symbolizing the purity and depth of his insight.

=== Pilgrimage and Dharma inheritance ===
In 1636, Zhangxue Tongzui traveled extensively to deepen his practice, including studying under Miyun Yuanwu at Tiantong Temple in Yin County (now part of Ningbo, east China's Zhejiang province. A pivotal moment occurred when, injured while gathering firewood, Zhangxue Tongzui experienced profound awakening upon hearing the sound of the temple's wooden clapper. After the Parinirvana of Miyun Yuanwu in 1642, he returned to Shuanggui Temple, and received full Dharma transmission under Poshang Haiming, becoming a key figure in the Linji school.

=== Revival of Buddhism in the southwest China ===
Amid the turmoil of the Ming-Qing transition, Zhangxue Tongzui dedicated himself to rebuilding Buddhist temples, including seven major temples: Xueju Temple (雪居寺) in Zunyi, Yumen Temple (禹门寺) in Shatan, Jingming Temple (静明寺) in Hanzhong, Qinglian Temple (青莲庵) in Jiaxing, Caotang Temple (草堂寺) in Baoning, Bore Temple (般若寺) in Zi County, and Zhaojue Temple in Chengdu.

In 1663, during the ruling of Kangxi Emperor of the Qing dynasty (1644–1912), Zhangxue Tongzui came to Chengdu, capital of southwest China's Sichuan province. When he witnessed the dilapidated site of Zhaojue Temple, which had once been resided by the renowned Song dynasty (960–1279) Chan master Yuanwu Keqin, he decided to oversee its reconstruction. The project took 12 years to complete, ultimately transforming the temple into a major Buddhist teaching center in southwest China.

=== Parinirvana ===
In 1695, Zhangxue Tongzui entered Parinirvana at Zhaojue Temple.

== Chan Philosophy and legacy ==
Zhangxue Tongzui embodied the Linji School's "sudden enlightenment" approach, employing direct methods such as shouts and strikes (棒喝) to awaken students. His teachings emphasized: "Ordinary Mind is the Way" (即心即佛) , realizing Buddha-nature in everyday activities; Integration of practice and labor: Balancing seated meditation with mindful work; promoted "farming Chan" (农禅) , integrating meditation with agricultural labor to foster self-sufficiency amid social instability.

== Works ==
Zhangxue Tongzui is known for vigorous, unrestrained cursive script, embodying the spontaneity of Chan Buddhism.

- Jinjiang Chandelier (锦江禅灯), a 20-volume compilation of biographies and teachings of Chan masters in southwestern China, preserving regional Buddhist history.
- Pine Poems (青松诗集), poetry collections reflect his fusion of Chan insight with natural imagery.
- Quotations from Chan Master Zhangxue of Zhaojue Temple (昭觉丈雪禅师语录)
