= Qiantang (disambiguation) =

Qiantang may refer to:

- Qiantang River in eastern China
- Qiantang, Chongqing, a town in Chongqing, China
- Qiantang, Guangdong, a town in Zhanjiang, Guangdong, China
- Qiantang District, a county-level city in Hangzhou, Zhejiang, China

== Former places ==
- Hangzhou, a city on the Qiantang River in Zhejiang, China, formerly known as Qiantang County
- Hang Prefecture, a prefecture around modern Hangzhou, briefly known as Qiantang Prefecture during Wuyue (907–978)

== See also ==
- Qian Tang (born 1950), Assistant-Director General for Education at UNESCO
