= Lu Zuofu =

Chinese industrialist and social activist

- 卢作孚
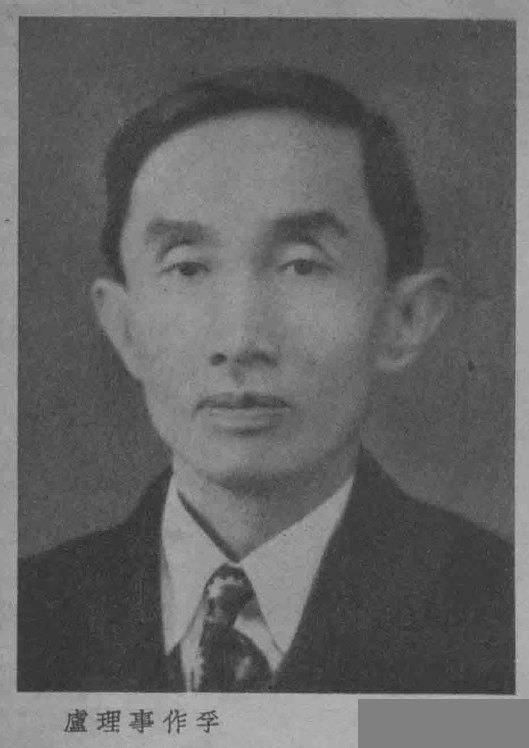
- "Director Lu Zuofu"
- Born: Lu Kuixian (卢魁先); 14 April 1893; Hezhou, Chongqing Prefecture, Sichuan, Qing Empire
- Died: 8 February 1952 (aged 58); Chongqing, Sichuan, China
- Other name: Lu Si (卢思)
- Occupations: Industrialist, activist
- Years active: 1910–1952

Chinese name
- Traditional Chinese: 盧作孚
- Simplified Chinese: 卢作孚
Transcriptions
Standard Mandarin
- Hanyu Pinyin: lú zuòfú
- Wade–Giles: Lu Tso-fu

Lu Zuofu (simplified Chinese: 卢作孚; traditional Chinese: 盧作孚, 14 April 1893 – 8 February 1952), formerly known as Lu Kuixian, was a Chinese industrialist and the founder of the Minsheng Shipping Company (currently Chongqing Minsheng Industry). He oversaw the relocation of personnel and supplies from Wuhan and Yichang to Sichuan in 1938. He was the director of National Grain Bureau of the Nationalist government as well as a representative of the First National Assembly.

== Early life ==
Lu was born as Lu Kuixian in Hezhou, Chongqing Prefecture on 14 April 1893. His parents were small merchants. In 1900, Lu and his brother attended a local private school, and in the following year he transferred to Ruishan Academy. At the age of 14, he completed primary school, but was unable to pursue further formal education due to financial constraints. In 1908, Lu changed his given name to Si, and later went by his courtesy name Zuofu. He enrolled in a cram school in Chengdu to study mathematics and English.

In 1910, Lu joined the anti-Qing secret society Tongmenghui, and later participated in the Railway Protection Movement. After the fall of the Qing government and subsequent failure of the Second Revolution, Lu fled Chengdu to escape the persecution of suspected revolutionaries. He sought refuge in Jiang'an County of Southern Sichuan, where he worked as a math teacher at a local middle school. In 1914, Lu traveled to Beiping before visiting Shanghai, where he met the writer and reporter Huang Yanpei. Huang recommended him to work as an editor at Commercial Press, but Lu declined the offer. Instead, he returned to his hometown, which had been renamed to Hechuan in 1913, and taught at Hechuan Middle School.

In 1916, Lu went to Chengdu and became a reporter for Qunbao (Chinese: 群报). He briefly returned to Hechuan to participate in the compilation of Hechuan County Chronicle, before moving back to Chengdu to work as the editor-in-chief of Chuanbao (Chinese: 川报). During the May Fourth Movement, he joined Young China Association (Chinese: 少年中国学会) and published several articles advocating for "saving the country through education."

At the invitation the warlord Yang Sen, Lu served as the head of the Education Section of Yongning Circuit in 1921. He hired fellow members of Young China Association, including Wang Dexi and Yun Daiying, to implement educational reforms. These efforts were discontinued due to ongoing military conflicts among Sichuan warlords. Three years later, Lu established the Popular Education Center (Chinese: 民众通俗教育馆) in Chengdu with support from Yang Sen. The education center was forced to close after Yang was defeated by rival warlords.

== Industrial career ==
In 1925, Lu returned to Hechuan and founded the Minsheng Industrial Company. Using capital raised with friends, he traveled to Shanghai to order an iron-hulled ship with a carrying capacity of 70.6 tons. Completed in May 1926, the vessel was named "Minsheng" and began transport operations along the Jialing River, connecting Hechuan with Chongqing.

At the beginning of 1927, Lu arrived in Beibei and served as the director of a local special defense corps. In August of that year, he invited Danish engineer Jesper Johansen Schultz to survey, design and oversee the construction of a railway connecting Chuanbei and Hechuan counties. The resulting 16.5 kilometer long Beichuan Railway was fully completed and opened in March 1935.

On 27 March 1928, Lu converted a temple dedicated to Guan Yu into the Beibei Library with approximately 400 books donated by the local community. In 1930, Lu similarly transformed the upper hall of Dongyue Temple in Huoyan Mountain into the Western Science Academy of China (Chinese: 中国西部科学院) with support from scholars and politicians like Cai Yuanpei, Huang Yanpei, and Weng Wenhao.

In 1929, under Lu's leadership, the Minsheng Company built two new ships, "Minyong" and "Minwang", with a total tonnage of 230. The company's operational routes were expanded to the Yangtze, connecting Chongqing to Mianyang and Shanghai. Lu was also appointed by warlord Liu Xiang as the director of the Sichuan River Navigation Administration (Chinese: 川江航务管理处).

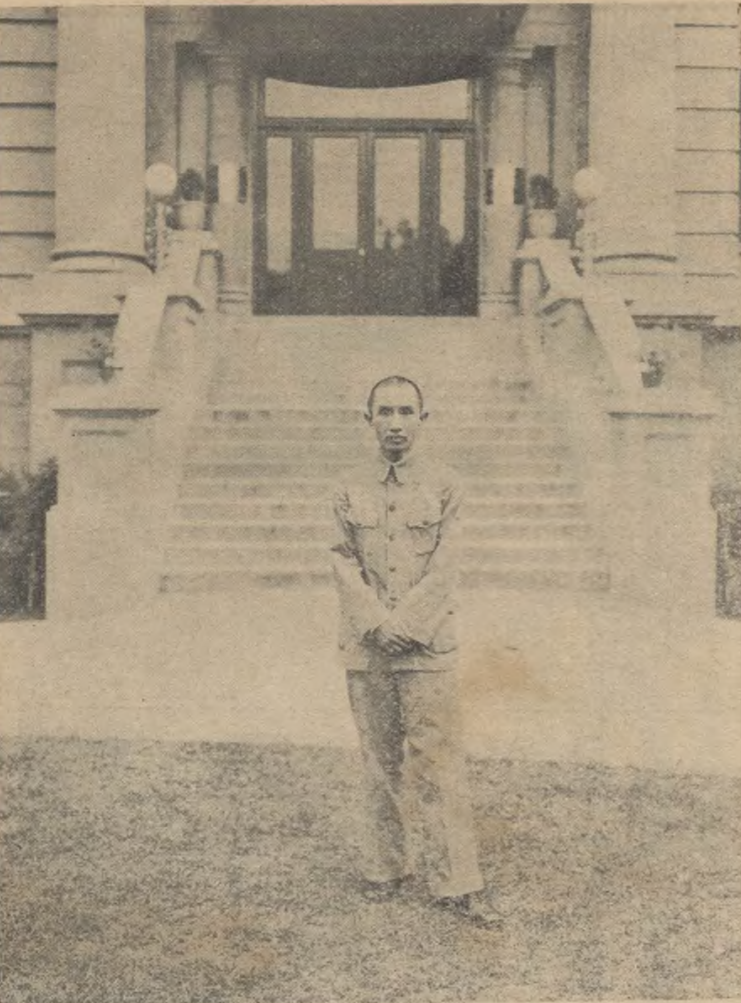
Lu Zuofu in 1935

In the autumn of 1930, Lu founded the Beibei Private Jianshan Middle School. In 1933, he facilitated the merger of five major coal plants along the Beichuan Railway, leading to the formation of the Tianfu Mining Company (Chinese: 天府矿业公司). Between 1931 and 1935, he also consolidated shipping companies of upstream Yangtze to counter foreign competition. By 1937, Minsheng Company owned 46 ships with a combined tonnage of over 10,000 and nearly 4,000 employees, making it the largest national shipping enterprise in China at that time.

== Second Sino-Japanese War ==
After the outbreak of the Second Sino-Japanese War, the Chinese government began relocating government agencies, schools, factories and civilians to Hubei and Sichuan. In 1937, Lu's Minsheng Industrial Company cooperated with other companies to transport a large number of personnel and materials from cities in East China, including Shanghai, Zhenjiang and Nanjing, to Wuhan and Yichang. Between October and December, Minsheng Industrial Company transported 5,834 tons of public property, 2,000 tons of military equipment, and 657 tons of commercial goods from Nanjing to Hankou.

In January 1938, Lu was appointed the Executive Vice Minister of the Ministry of Transportation and Communications of the Nationalist government. Following the fall of Wuhan to Japanese forces in October 1938, Yichang became a critical hub for the evacuation of personnel and materials to Sichuan. On October 23, 1938, Lu arrived in Yichang to oversee the evacuation efforts. Due to limited ship capacity, he requested the Ministry of Transportation and Communications to requisition 2,000 wooden boats from Chongqing and an additional 800 from Hubei. In the following two months, more than 30,000 people and 100,000 tons of supplies were transported to Sichuan. Due to bombings by Japanese military aircraft, Minsheng Company lost 16 ships during transportation, 116 employees died, and 61 others were disabled.

The Yichang evacuation included military units like Gongxian Arsenal, as well as light and heavy industrial and aviation industry entities. According to statistics from the Ministry of Economic Affairs, the machinery and equipment evacuated from arsenals and private enterprises during this operation could produce 300,000 grenades, 70,000 mortar shells, 6,000 aircraft bombs, and over 200,000 pickaxes per month. Due to its scale and importance, Chinese educator Y. C. James Yen referred to it as "the Dunkirk of Chinese industry." Due to his outstanding contributions in the evacuation, the Chinese government awarded Lu the third-class Brilliant Jade Medal in January 1939.

Before the fall of Yichang in June 1940, the Minsheng Company had evacuated more than 1.5 million people and more than 1 million tons of cargo into Sichuan. Among the evacuees were 64,000 individuals from government agencies, schools, factories, hospitals and other institutions, including educator Tao Xingzhi and teachers and students from dozens of colleges and universities such as Fudan University, Wuhan University and Republic of China Military Academy. Additionally, the company transported more than 2.7 million troops out of Sichuan to serve in the war. In July, Lu became the director of the National Grain Bureau (Chinese: 全国粮食局).

In 1943, the Western Science Academy of China collaborated with several educational institutions in Chongqing to establish the Western Museum of China, the predecessor of Chongqing Natural History Museum. Lu was among the 13 founding members of its board of directors.

In recognition of his contributions to military transportation during the war, the Nationalist government awarded Lu the second-class Propitious Clouds Medal in May 1944. Following the end of World War II, he also received the China War Memorial Medal in October 1945.

== Later years ==
As the Chinese Civil War resumed in 1947, Minsheng Company faced significant financial hardship due to an unstable business environment. Between 1947 and 1949, Lu undertook business trips to several cities across China, including Qingdao, Kaohsiung and Guangzhou. He stayed in Hong Kong in October 1949, when the Nationalist government sent Yu Hung-chun, George Yeh and others to urge him to move to Taiwan. Simultaneously, representatives of the newly established People's Republic of China lobbied him to join the new regime. On June 10, 1950, Lu brought his fleet in Hong Kong to join the PRC, and signed a public-private partnership agreement with the new government. He was elected as a member of the National Committee of the Chinese People's Political Consultative Conference.

During the Three-anti and Five-anti Campaigns of 1951–1952, the Minsheng Company fell into financial difficulties due to poor operations. On 5 February 1952, the company's flagship vessel, "Minduo," ran aground and sank in Fengdu. Three days later, the company held a Five-anti Campaign mobilization meeting, during which Lu was accused of "corrupting and influencing state officials". That night, Lu died by suicide at his home in Chongqing.
