= Poshan Haiming =

- 破山海明

Personal life
- Born: March 8, 1597 Dazhu County, Sichuan, Ming China
- Died: April 19, 1666 (aged 69) Shuanggui Temple, Qing China
- Parent: Jian Hong

Religious life
- Religion: Chan Buddhism
- Temple: Shuanggui Temple
- School: Linji school
- Lineage: 35th generation

Senior posting
- Teacher: Dachi; Rongguang; Hanshan Deqing; Wuyi Yuanlai; Xueqiao Yuanxin; Zhanran Yuancheng; Miyun Yuanwu
- Students: Zhangxue Tongzui Xiangya Xingting Tizong Daoning Minshu Ruxiang

Chinese name
- Chinese: 破山海明
Transcriptions
Standard Mandarin
- Hanyu Pinyin: Pòshān Hǎimíng

Birth name
- Traditional Chinese: 蹇棟宇
- Simplified Chinese: 蹇栋宇
Transcriptions
Standard Mandarin
- Hanyu Pinyin: Jiǎn Dòngyǔ

Courtesy name
- Traditional Chinese: 懶愚
- Simplified Chinese: 懒愚
Transcriptions
Standard Mandarin
- Hanyu Pinyin: Lǎnyú

Art name
- Traditional Chinese: 旭東
- Simplified Chinese: 旭东
Transcriptions
Standard Mandarin
- Hanyu Pinyin: Xùdōng

Poshan Haiming (Chinese: 破山海明; 8 March 1597 – 19 April 1666) was a towering figure in Chinese Chan Buddhism during the late Ming and early Qing dynasties. Revered as the "Little Śākyamuni" and the founder of the Shuanggui Temple (Double Laurel Temple), he revitalized the Linji school of Chan Buddhism in southwestern China, leaving an indelible mark on Buddhist history.

== Early life and monastic beginnings ==
Poshan Haiming was born on 8 March 1597, in Dazhu County, Sichuan, during the late Ming dynasty (1368–1644), to Jian Hong (蹇弘), a descent from a prominent Ming dynasty official Jian Yi (蹇义). His ancestral home was in Ba County (now in Chongqing). He was given the secular name Jian Dongyu (蹇栋宇). At age 19, disillusioned with worldly life, he renounced his family and was ordained under Chan master Dachi (大持) at the Jiangjia Temple (姜家庵) in his home-county, receiving the monastic name Haiming (海明) and the art name Xudong (旭东). He initially studied the Śūraṅgama Sūtra but was plagued by doubts. This prompted a journey across China, he visited sacred sites like Sizu Temple in Hubei and engaging in rigorous meditation at Potou Mountain (破头山).

== Ascetic practices ==
For years, Poshan Haiming secluded himself on Potou Mountain, embracing extreme asceticism. During this period, he adopted the name "Poshan" (破山; 'Breaking Mountain'), symbolizing both his location and the shattering of delusions. In a transformative incident, he fell from a cliff, severely injuring his leg. The intense pain provoked a profound awakening, deepening his understanding of Chan principles. He later studied under Miyun Yuanwu at the Jinsu Temple in Zhejiang. Their "mind-to-mind seal" confirmed him as a legitimate heir of the Caoxi lineage, solidifying his role in the Linji school.

== Teaching career ==
In 1629, Poshan Haiming began his teaching career at Dongta Temple in Zhejiang, where he compiled discourses and attracted disciples. By 1632, he returned to Sichuan, presiding over major temples like Wanffng Temple and Taiping Temple. His sermons drew followers from Yunnan, Guizhou, and beyond. In 1653, with support from general Yao Yulin (姚玉麟) , he established Shuanggui Temple in Liangping. According to legend, two laurel trees gifted by his teacher symbolized the site's sanctity. The temple became the "Leading Temple of Southwest China".

== Death ==
On 19 April 1666, Poshan Haiming died at Shuanggui Temple at age 70. He ordained over 100 disciples and authorized 87 dharma heirs, spreading his teachings across East Asia and North America.

== Works ==
Poshan Haiming composed over 1,300 poems reflecting on nature, war, and human suffering. He also mastered cursive calligraphy, praised for its elegance and depth.

- Shi Daojian (释道坚), ed. (2007-03-01). 破山海明禅师语录 [Quotations from Chan Master Poshan Haiming] (in Chinese). Beijing: Religious Culture Publishing House. ISBN 9787801238450.
- Xiong Shaohua (熊少华), ed. (2014). 破山禅师法书 [Calligraphy by Chan Master Poshan Haiming] (in Chinese). Chongqing: Chongqing Publishing House. ISBN 9787229070748.

== Future reading ==
- Xiong Shaohua (熊少华) (2019). 破山禅师评传 [Critical Biography of Chan Master Poshan Haiming]. Chongqing: Chongqing Publishing House. ISBN 9787229140908.

Buddhist titles
Preceded by Miyun Yuanwu	35th generation of Linji school 1622–1666	Succeeded by Zhangxue Tongzui
