= Siege of Diaoyucheng =

1259 siege during the Mongol-Song conflict; Song victory

- Part of the Mongol conquest of the Song dynasty
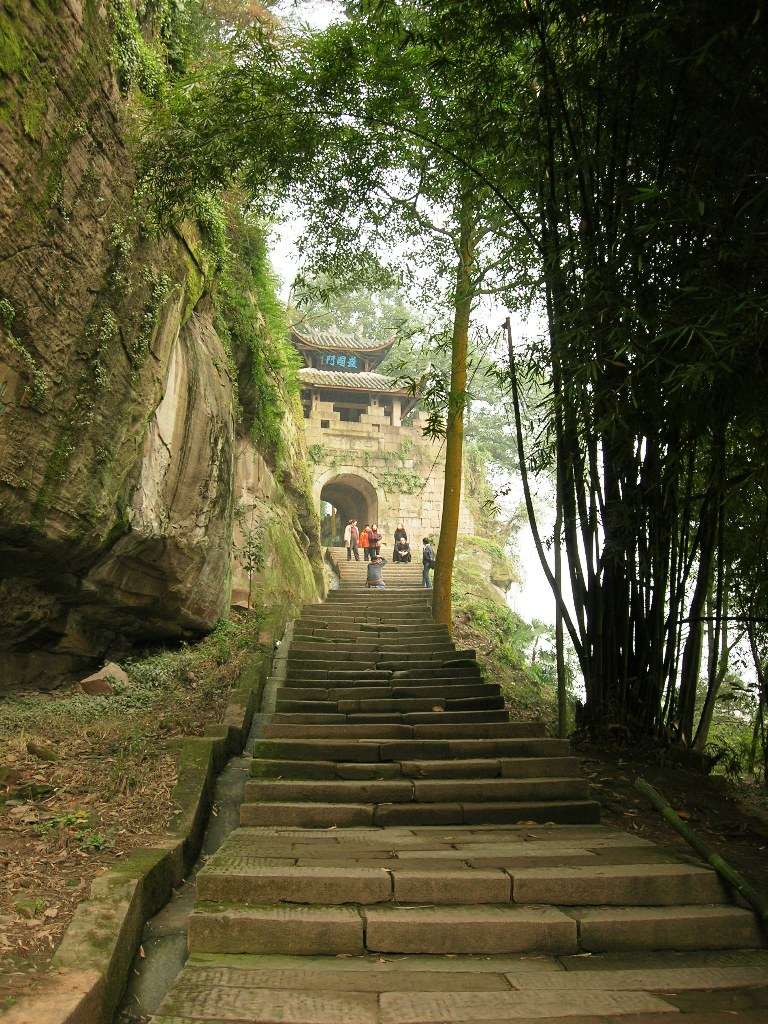
- Diaoyu Fortress in 2006
Date	February 1259 – August 1259
Location	Hechuan, Chongqing, China
Result	Song victory

Belligerents
Mongol Empire	Southern Song

Commanders and leaders
Möngke Khan †; Wang Dechen †	Wang Jian; Zhang Jue

Strength
100,000+	20,000–30,000

The siege of Diaoyucheng, alternatively the siege of Diaoyu Castle, was a battle between the Southern Song dynasty and the Mongol Empire in 1259. It occurred at the Diaoyu Fortress in modern-day Hechuan District, Chongqing, China. Möngke Khan, the fourth khagan of the Mongol Empire, lost his life in this battle, making it the only battle where the Mongols lost their khagan during their campaigns of conquest. This battle was preceded by the siege of Baghdad in 1258. The siege of Diaoyucheng was a setback for the Mongol conquest.

== Background ==
The Mongol Empire under Genghis Khan conquered vast lands and subjugated nations. Genghis Khan's last battle was fought in Western Xia but his life had come to an end before he was able to conquer it. His successors carried on his ambition. In the year 1234, the Mongols conquered the Jin dynasty with the assistance of the Song.

In the same year, the Song attempted to take back its northern territories originally occupied by the Jin. In September 1234, the Mongols responded with the siege of Luoyang. The Song army holding Luoyang was short on food supplies. Additionally, the Mongols led the water of Yellow River into the city, causing great casualties among the Song army.

The fall of Luoyang was simply a prologue of a series of upcoming battles which lasted decades. The Mongols blamed the Song for "breaking the alliance".

== In Sichuan ==
After 1234, the Mongols launched an all-out war against the Song dynasty. They attacked from both the east and west flanks, crippling the Chinese defenses. Despite these initial military successes, the Song army managed to retaliate. No significant advancement was made.

Under the command of Meng Gong, Yu Jie, and other generals, the Song army fended off the advancing Mongols. In Sichuan, Meng Gong led the Song army as it held its position against the Mongols in 1239 and 1240.

== Defense by Yu Jie ==
In 1243, Yu Jie was appointed the commander of the Song army in Sichuan. When he came to Sichuan, he discovered that, due to the Mongol invasion, the Sichuan region was in a state of anarchy. The Song army was able to defend itself by forming smaller military units that did not have superiority over each other. In order to reverse the dire situation in Sichuan, Yu sought the advice of the people under his command. Ran Lian and Ran Pu, two hermits of Bozhou, came to his office and offered him the plan of building a castle in Hechuan. Specifically, the plan was to build a castle on Diaoyu Mountain of Hechuan. Hechuan sits at the eastern entrance of Sichuan region, and the Mongols had to pass it before advancing further into the interior of Sichuan. Thus, Diaoyu Mountain was a great defensive vantage point for the Song army.

Yu Jie ordered the construction of dozens of castles in different counties and made these castles the administrative centre of local government. All the castles that were built were situated on the tops of mountains which made them extremely formidable against any offensive. Diaoyu Castle was built in March 1243 and became the administrative center of Hechuan county.

Meanwhile, the Mongols began to cultivate lands in occupied territories in Sichuan. This action distressed the Song army since they would not be able to recover these lost territories once the Mongols acquired a permanent source of food and supplies.

== Offensive by Möngke ==
The long-term standoff between Song and Mongols lasted till 1258. After receiving the news of Hulagu reporting the demise of Baghdad and its caliph, Möngke Khan decided to break the standoff by leading a large army into Sichuan himself. He also ordered his younger brother Kublai to march towards Hangzhou, the capital of Song. The offensive consisted of three waves of armies. Möngke led his troop across Dasan Pass and entered the city of Hanzhong while the other two waves of advancing forces made their way to Micang pass and Mianzhou.

The resistance of the Song army in Sichuan was ineffective. By the spring of 1259, Möngke reached the city of Hechuan. In order to take Hechuan, the Mongols had to capture Diaoyu Castle.

== Siege of Diaoyu Castle ==
Möngke's siege of Diaoyu Castle began sometime between 24 February and 25 March 1259. The siege lasted for approximately five months.

The commander of the Song forces in the castle was Wang Jian. Möngke sent his general Wang Dechen as the vanguard of the Mongol army. The Mongols initially tried to break the castle's gates. When this strategy was proven ineffective, they started night raids on the outer part of the castle on minor defensive structures. Although these raids surprised the Song army at first, the Mongols were not able to break into the castle. During these attempts, Wang Dechen was killed by a Song mangonel.

In the seventh month of the first year of Kaiqing, Möngke was giving up the original plan of capturing the castle and instead, to dispatch his remaining forces to attack Chongqing, however, Diaoyu Fortress would soon prove to be his place of demise, as Möngke died during the siege. Sources differ on how Möngke actually died—Chinese sources claim that Möngke was mortally injured by artillery fire from either a shell or stone projectile from a cannon shot or trebuchet, or a bolt from a crossbow arrow (this claim is corroborated by the writings of the Syriac monk Bar Hebraeus), while Persian sources suggest that Möngke died from infectious diseases like dysentery or cholera (Chinese sources confirm the existence of an outbreak during the siege).

After receiving the news that his brother died, Kublai decided to withdraw his troops. He threatened the Song that he would attack Lin'an, the capital of Song, to deter any possible retaliation by the Song armies. His strategy proved effective. The prime minister of Song Jia Sidao soon sent his ambassador to negotiate a peace treaty.

Diaoyu Castle remained in the hands of Song armies. Mongols under Kublai tried to take it in 1263 but failed again. In the following decade, the Mongols routinely returned to the castle every autumn. In 1279, the garrison of Diaoyu Castle surrendered to the Mongols two months before the end of the Song dynasty; the commanders committed suicide rather than swearing fealty to the Mongols.

== Aftermath ==
From 1246 to 1279, the Chinese resistance to Mongol conquest in the region of Sichuan lasted 36 years. The unexpected stubborn defense of the Chinese garrison in Diaoyu Castle caused the Mongols much trouble, such as the Mongol defeat in Egypt as a result of Hulagu's sudden retreat after the death of Möngke.

The death of Möngke led to the division of the Mongol Empire. Hulagu remained in Persia permanently while Kublai and Ariq Böke tried to seize the title of Khan for themselves. The Song dynasty was temporarily rescued from the brink of destruction. However, Kublai eventually marked the end of Song dynasty in the year of 1279, 20 years after the siege of Diaoyu Castle. Both events were irreversible and had great significance in Chinese, Mongolian, and world history.
