= Pu Prefecture =

Pu Prefecture or Puzhou may refer to:

- Pu Prefecture (Shandong) (濮州), a prefecture between the 6th and 20th centuries in modern Shandong, China
- Pu Prefecture (Shanxi) (蒲州), a prefecture between the 6th and 20th centuries in modern Shanxi, China
- Pu Prefecture (Sichuan) (普州), a prefecture between the 6th and 14th centuries in modern Sichuan, China

== See also ==
- Pu (disambiguation)
