= Diaoyucheng =

Fortress on the Diaoyu Mountain, Chongqing, China

- 釣魚城 (Chinese)
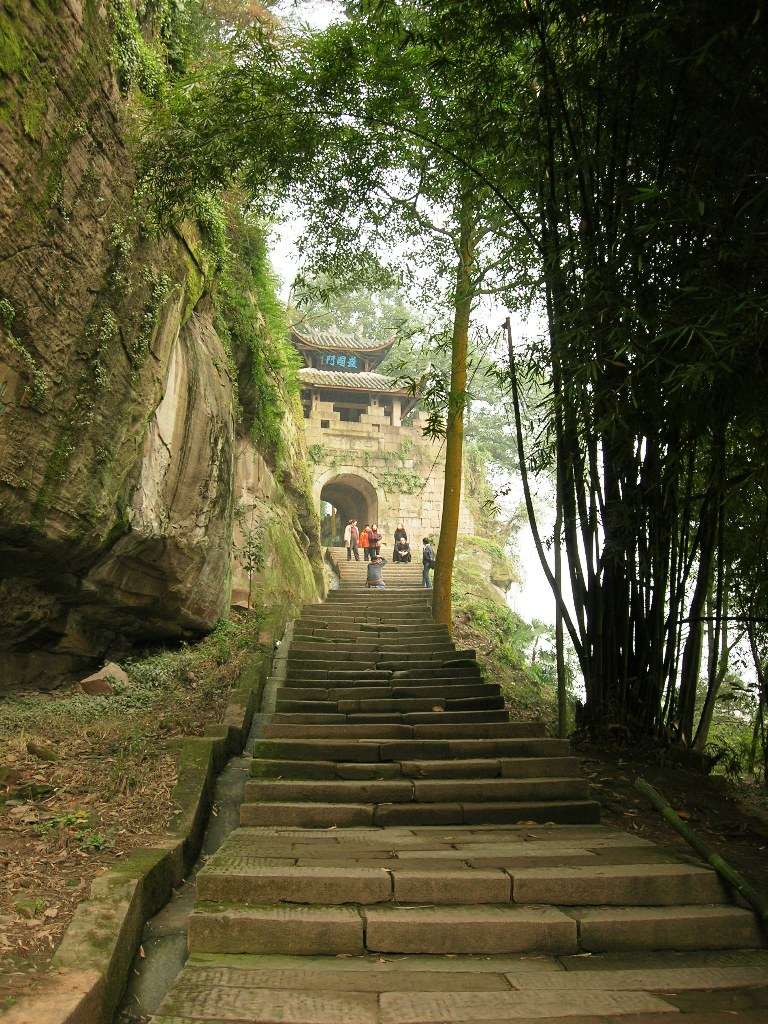
- The steep pathway up to the Huguo Gate of Diaoyucheng

- Location of Diaoyu Fortress Diaoyucheng (Chongqing)
- 30.005°N 106.315°E
- Location: China
- Region: Hechuan District, Chongqing

History
- Built: 1242

The Diaoyucheng (simplified Chinese: 钓鱼城; traditional Chinese: 釣魚城; pinyin: Diàoyúchéng), or Diaoyu Fortress, is a fortress located on the Diaoyu Mountain in Hechuan District, Chongqing, across the Jialing River from the city center of Hechuan. It is known for its resistance to the Mongol armies in the latter half of the Song dynasty.

== History ==
The death of Mongol leader Möngke Khan without a successor during the siege of Diaoyucheng resulted in the immediate withdrawal of Mongol troops from various parts of Eurasia, especially Syria, precipitating the Toluid Civil War, Mongol losses at the Battle of Ain Jalut, and Division of the Mongol Empire.

Although the Mongols and the Southern Song were united in their fight to bring down the Jurchen Jin dynasty, their pact broke immediately afterwards, and the Mongols launched an aggressive war against the tenacious Southern Song that lasted for more than a third of the 13th century. In the period from 1243 to 1279, Diaoyu experienced more than two hundred military confrontations in a miracle of "persistent resistance" that endured for thirty-six years.

Though numbering more than ten thousand and led by the Great Khan Möngke himself, the Mongols were unable to take the tiny fortress. Yu Jian won many brilliant victories, culminating in the deaths of Möngke and his vanguard General Wang Tege. Sources differ on how Möngke actually died—Chinese sources largely claim that Möngke was mortally wounded by a crossbow arrow (this claim is corroborated by the writings of the Syriac monk Bar Hebraeus) or a stone projectile from a cannon or trebuchet, while Persian sources suggest that Möngke died from infectious diseases like dysentery or cholera (Chinese sources confirm the existence of an outbreak during the siege).

== Location ==
The ancient Diaoyu covers an area of 2.94 square kilometres. Situated on a hill surrounded by water on three sides, it is located about five kilometers east of Hechuan, Chongqing, near the confluence of the Qu, Fu and Jialing rivers. The terrain is precipitous yet beautiful. About 700 years ago, Yu Jian built a fortress here to resist the Mongols during the Southern Song Dynasty (1127–1279).

== Sites ==
As it contains many historical sites—a naval wharf, drilling grounds, watch towers, and a fortification with built-in cannons—Diaoyu has been designated a major national cultural and historic site by China's State Council, and on 28 August 2018 it was placed on the World Cultural Heritage Tentative List.

== See also ==
- Diaoyucheng, a 2012 Chinese opera based on the historic battle
- Siege of Diaoyucheng
- Sichuan anti-Mongol fortresses
