= Shuanggui Temple =

Buddhist temple

- 双桂堂
- Location within Chongqing Location within China

Religion
- Affiliation: Buddhism
- Sect: Linji school

Location
- Location: Jindai Town, Liangping District, Chongqing, China
- Interactive map of Shuanggui Temple
- Coordinates: 30°36′40″N 107°42′46″E

Architecture
- Style: Chinese architecture
- Founder: Poshan Haiming (破山海明)
- Established: 1653

Shuanggui Temple (simplified Chinese: 双桂堂; traditional Chinese: 雙桂堂; pinyin: Shuāngguì Sì; lit. 'Temple of Two Osmanthus Fragrans Trees') is a Buddhist temple located in Jindai Town, Liangping District, Chongqing, China.

== History ==
Shuanggui Temple was built as "Fuguo Temple" (福国寺) by an accomplished Chan master Poshan Haiming (破山海明) in 1653, in the 10th year of Shunzhi Emperor's reign during the Qing dynasty (1644–1911). Due to its two osmanthus fragrans trees, the temple is also known as "Shuanggui Temple" (Shuang means two, Gui means osmanthus fragrans).

During the Cultural Revolution, monks put statues of Buddhist and cultural relics into wooden box with Quotations from Chairman Mao Tse-tung posted outside.

In 1983, the temple was inscribed to the National Key Buddhist Temples in Han Chinese Area List by the State Council of China.

In 2013, it has been designated as a "Major National Historical and Cultural Sites in Chongqing" by the State Council of China.

== Architecture ==
The extant buildings of Shuanggui Temple include the Shanmen, Mahavira Hall, Maitreya Hall, Dabei Hall (Hall of Great Compassion), Ordination Hall, Five Hundred Arhats Hall and Buddhist Texts Library.

=== Mahavira Hall ===
The Mahavira Hall was first built in 1653 by Chan master Poshan (破山), and underwent three renovations, respectively in 1758, 1822 and 1889. Now it is 25 metres (82 ft) wide, 19 metres (62 ft) deep and 10 metres (33 ft) high with 72 stone pillars supporting the roof. Statues of Sakyamuni, Ananda and Kassapa Buddha are enshrined in the middle of the hall. The statues of Eighteen Arhats, Manjushri and Samantabhadra stand on both sides of the hall.

=== Five Hundred Arhats Hall ===
The Five Hundred Arhats Hall enshrines five hundred life-like arhats with different looks and manners. It was built in 1998.
