= Huguang Huiguan, Chongqing =

Guild hall in Chongqing, China

Coordinates: 29°33′39″N 106°35′00″E

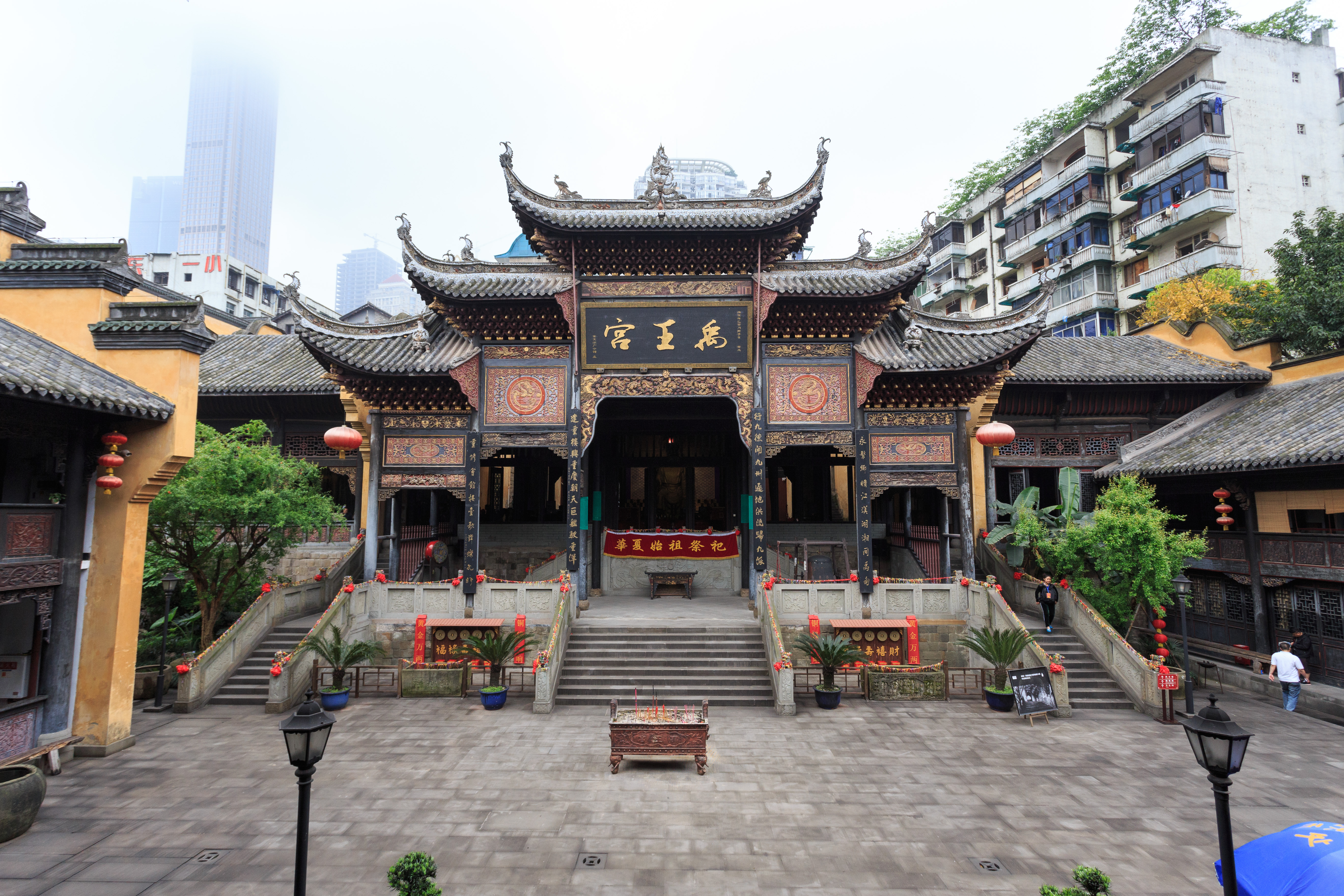
View in Huguang Huiguan, Chongqing

Huguang Huiguan (aka Huguang Guild Hall, Lianghu Guild Hall, and Yu King Palace, in Chinese: simplified Chinese: 湖广会馆; traditional Chinese: 湖廣會館) is a assembly hall in the Yuzhong District of Chongqing, China, on the Yangtze River.

Its Yuwang Temple was built during the Kangxi era (1661– 1722) and served migrants from Huguang (now Hunan and Hubei). Huguang Guild Hall was built around the temple in 1759, during the reign of the Qianlong Emperor in the Qing Dynasty. The present building was a reconstruction from 1846. It consists of a complex of courtyards, gardens, halls, meeting rooms, and theaters that acted as a regional center for business, entertainment, religious, and social activities. It was part of the Guild of Eight Provinces (八省會館) that effectively governed the city.

Huguang Huiguan is now a museum. Yuwang Temple, Guangdong House (aka Nanhua Palace), Qi'an House, and the Jiangxi Guild Hall are located within the complex.

== See also ==
- Huguang Guild Hall, Beijing
- List of Major National Historical and Cultural Sites in Chongqing
