= Erlang, Hechuan District =

Erlang 二郎镇
- Town
- Location in Chongqing
- Coordinates: 30°21′46″N 105°59′32″E
- Country: People's Republic of China
- Direct-administered municipality: Chongqing
- District: Hechuan District
- Time zone: UTC+8 (China Standard)

Erlang (Chinese: 二郎; pinyin: Èrláng) is a town under the administration of Hechuan District, Chongqing, China. As of 2023, it administers Erlang Residential Community and the following seven villages:

- Xingba Village (兴坝村)
- Baozhu Village (宝珠村)
- Shanlin Village (杉林村)
- Lianzhu Village (联珠村)
- Liuhe Village (六合村)
- Banyue Village (半月村)
- Songlin Village (松林村)

== See also ==
- List of township-level divisions of Chongqing
