= Taihe, Hechuan District =

Taihe 太和镇
- Town
- Location in Chongqing
- Coordinates: 30°6′4″N 106°2′58″E
- Country: People's Republic of China
- Direct-administered municipality: Chongqing
- District: Hechuan District
- Time zone: UTC+8 (China Standard)

Taihe (Chinese: 太和; pinyin: Tàihé) is a town under the administration of Hechuan District, Chongqing, China. As of 2020, it administers the following three residential neighborhoods and 21 villages:

Neighborhoods

- Sichouyuan Community (丝绸园社区)
- Mamenxi Community (马门溪社区)
- Daheba Community (大河坝社区)

Villages

- Taihe Village
- Tangjia Village (唐家村)
- Fuxing Village (复兴村)
- Wangxian Village (望仙村)
- Shiling Village (石岭村)
- Fujin Village (富金村)
- Shajin Village (沙金村)
- Shaijing Village (晒经村)
- Baima Village (白马村)
- Loufang Village (楼房村)
- Shiqiang Village (石墙村)
- Basan Village (把伞村)
- Baiyang Village (白阳村)
- Shiya Village (石垭村)
- Tingzi Village (亭子村)
- Bao'en Village (报恩村)
- Mulian Village (木莲村)
- Xianqiao Village (仙桥村)
- Xiaohe Village (小河村)
- Lingjiao Village (菱角村)
- Mishi Village (米市村)

== See also ==
- List of township-level divisions of Chongqing
