= List of Major National Historical and Cultural Sites in Chongqing =

This list is of Major Sites Protected for their Historical and Cultural Value at the National Level in the Municipality of Chongqing, People's Republic of China.

Site	Chinese name	Location	Designation	Image
Chongqing Office of the Eighth Route Army	Balujun Chongqing banshichu jiuzhi 八路军重庆办事处旧址	Chongqing 重庆市	1-28	Upload file
Dazu Rock Carvings (Beishan)	Beishan moya zaoxiang 北山摩崖造像	29°22′58″N 105°28′21″E Dazu District 大足县	1-45	Upload file
Dazu Rock Carvings (Baodingshan)	Baodingshan moya zaoxiang 宝顶山摩崖造像	29°22′58″N 105°28′21″E Dazu District 大足县	1-46	Upload file
China-US Cooperation Concentration Camp Site	"Zhong-Mei hezuosuo" jizhongying jiuzhi “中美合作所”集中营旧址	Chongqing 重庆市	3-163	Upload file
Inscriptions of Baiheliang	Baiheliang tike 白鹤梁题刻	29°42′58″N 107°23′02″E Chongqing 重庆市	3-172	Upload file
Longgupo Site	Longgupo yizhi 龙骨坡遗址	Wushan County 巫山县	4-1	Upload file
Diaoyu Fortress	Diaoyu cheng yizhi 钓鱼城遗址	Hechuan District 合川市	4-55	Upload file
Gaojiazhen Site	Gaojiazhen yizhi 高家镇遗址	Fengdu County 丰都县	5-102	Upload file
Zhang Huanhou Temple	Zhang Huan hou miao 张桓侯庙	30°54′44″N 108°41′57″E Yunyang County 云阳县	5-380	Upload file
Shibaozhai	Shibaozhai 石宝寨	30°25′30″N 108°10′41″E Zhong County 忠县	5-381	Upload file
Dingfang Que and Wuming Que	Dingfang que - Wuming que 丁房阙—无铭阙	Zhong County 忠县	5-382	Upload file
Residence of Zhang Zhizhong	Guiyuan 桂园	Chongqing 重庆市	5-506	Upload file
Former Residence of Zhao Shiyan	Zhao Shiyan guju 赵世炎故居	Youyang Tujia and Miao Autonomous County 酉阳县	5-507	Upload file
Baidicheng	Baidi cheng 白帝城	31°02′36″N 109°34′12″E Fengjie County 奉节县	6-692	Upload file
Huguang Huiguan, Chongqing	Chongqing Huguang huiguan 重庆湖广会馆	Chongqing 重庆市	6-693	Upload file
Sculptures in the Great Buddha Monastery, Tongnan	Tongnan Dafo si moya zaoxiang 潼南大佛寺摩崖造像	Tongnan County 潼南县	6-851	Upload file
Rock sculptures in the monastery of Erfo Laitan	Laitan Erfo si moya zaoxiang 涞滩二佛寺摩崖造像	Hechuan District 合川市		Upload file
Yang Family Residence	Yangshi minzhai 杨氏民宅	Tongnan County 潼南县	6-1034	Upload file
Former Site of the West China Academy of Science	Zhongguo xibu kexueyuan jiuzhi 中国西部科学院旧址	Chongqing 重庆市	6-1035	Upload file
Former Site of Yucai School	Yucai xuexiao jiuzhi 育才学校旧址	Hechuan District 合川市	6-1036	Upload file

== See also ==
- Principles for the Conservation of Heritage Sites in China
