= Beibei Library =

Public library in Chongqing, China

- 29.8288°N 106.4412°E
- Type: Public library
- Established: 1928

Other information
- Website: www.cqbblib.org.cn

The Beibei Library (simplified Chinese: 北碚图书馆; traditional Chinese: 北碚圖書館) is a Chongqing-based public library in China, located at No. 26 Park Village, Beibei, Chongqing. It was originally named the Gorge District Library, founded by Lu Zuofu on May 27, 1928. At its inception, it had an area of 499.5 m^{2} (5,377 sq ft) and a collection of more than four hundred books. It is the most complete collection of newspapers and magazines published during the Republic of China period in the whole of China.

Beibei Library is a national first-level library and a national key unit for the protection of ancient books in China.

== History ==
After the end of the Second Sino-Japanese War, Beibei Library received a gift of nearly 10,000 volumes of news weeklies from the United States Information Agency.

In November 1945, Lu Zuofu merged Minsheng Company Library, Public Library of Beibei Administration, and Library of the West China Academy of Sciences to form the "Beibei Library".
