= Tung Wah Coffin Home =

Coffin home in Sandy Bay, Hong Kong

Coordinates: 22.2712°N 114.1253°E

Tung Wah Coffin Home 東華義莊
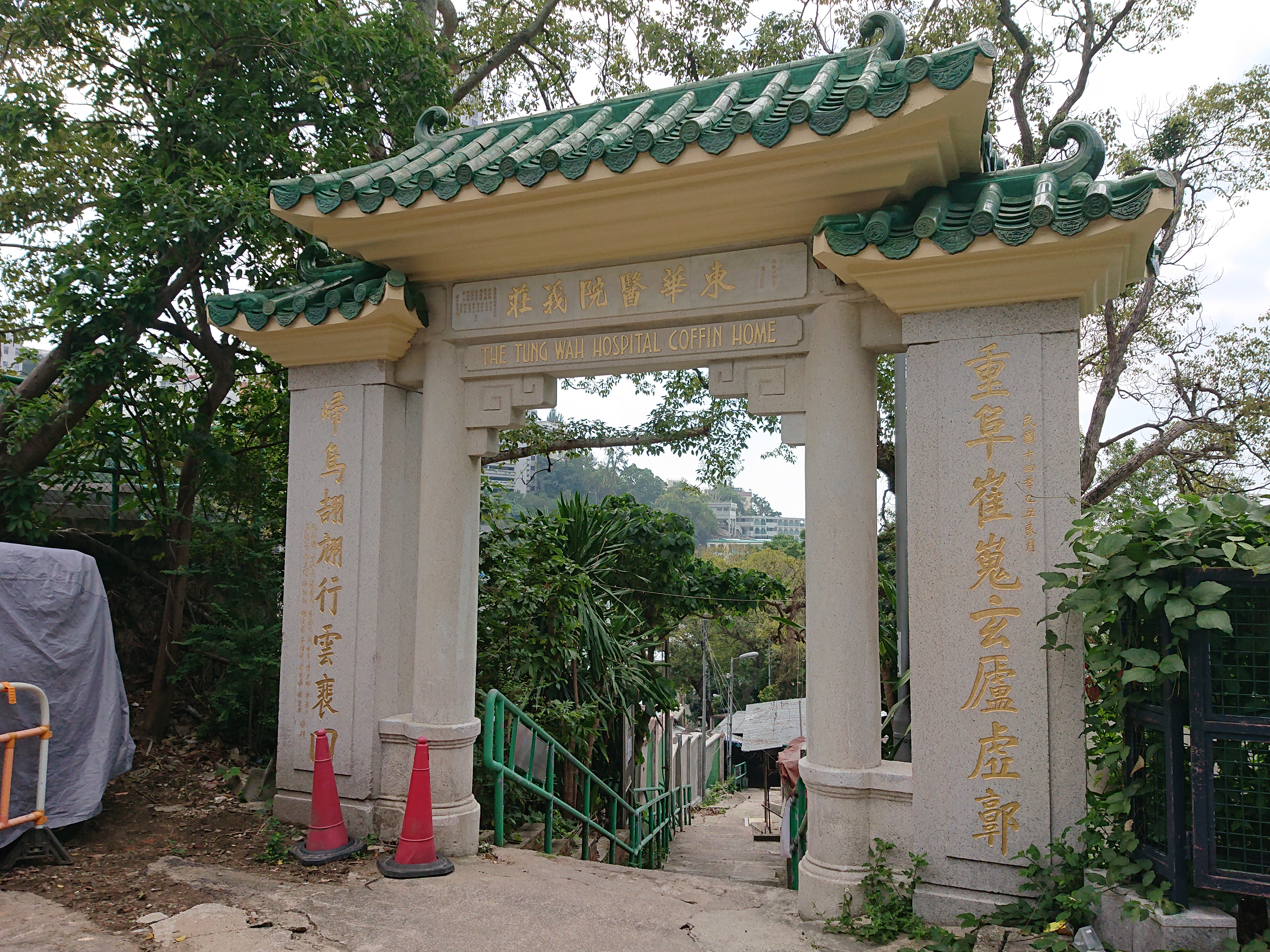
- Front entrance of Tung Wah Coffin Home
- Interactive map of the Tung Wah Coffin Home 東華義莊 area

General information
- Type: Coffin home
- Location: Sandy Bay, 9 Sandy Bay Road, Hong Kong Island, Hong Kong
- Completed: 1899; 127 years ago
- Renovated: Award of Honor (2005); Award of Merit (2005)

Technical details
- Floor area: 6,050 m^{2}

Declared Monument of Hong Kong
- Designated: 2020
- Reference no.: 125

Tung Wah Coffin Home
- Traditional Chinese: 東華義莊
Transcriptions
Yue: Cantonese
- Yale Romanization: Dūng wàah yih jōng
- Jyutping: Dung1 waa5 ji6 zong1

Tung Wah Coffin Home is a coffin home located upon the hill above Sandy Bay on Hong Kong Island, in Hong Kong.

The history of Tung Wah Coffin Home began in 1875 when it was built by the Man Mo Temple. The Coffin Home was originally located in Kennedy Town near a slaughterhouse. The Tung Wah Group of Hospitals then took over the responsibility of managing the coffin home, and it was rebuilt in 1899 near Sandy Bay on Hong Kong Island. It was then renamed as the Tung Wah Coffin Home.

== History and development ==
The Coffin Home was originally established in 1875 by the Man Mo Temple in Kennedy Town near a slaughterhouse. In 1899, it was rebuilt in its current location under the new management of Tung Wah Group of Hospitals, thus receiving its present name, Tung Wah Coffin Home. The Coffin Home is a temporary coffin and urn depository awaiting transference to the birthplaces of the deceased. The coffins mainly belong to overseas Chinese who are transferred and buried in their home villages in China.

The Tung Wah Coffin Home has always been developing since its relocation to Sandy Bay. The Coffin Home experienced its first reconstruction period in 1913, which built a designated storage place for cremated ashes. Later in 1926, the government allotted approximately 56,000 square feet (5,200 m^{2}) of land for the expansion of Tung Wah Coffin Home. Bing Yan Hall (丙寅莊), a 3-story building, was then built within this space.

Due to Japan's invasion of Hong Kong during World War II, coffins were unable to be transported back to China and remained in the Coffin Home. The board of Tung Wah Hospital group thus initiated a plan to build more room clusters to meet the high demand of coffin space. Later in 1947, the board proposed a change in the use of room clusters to cope with the increasing demand. The Tung Wah group carried out several reconstructions in the years 1948, 1951, and 1957 to solve problems dealing with the lack of storage space for bodies after exhumation. In 1960, there were a total 670 coffins, 8,060 exhumed bodies and 116 cremains (cremation) stored at the Tung Wah Coffin Home.

The Sandy Bay Sanatorium under the Tung Wah Group was soon in need of expansion. Thus in 1961, the board of Tung Wah group decided to incorporate the Bing Yan Hall into the Sanatorium. At the same time, Yut Yuet Hall (日月莊) was built to replace Bing Yan Hall to store coffins. In the following years, the social climate had changed. Due to the lack of graveyard space, the government advocated a cremation policy. In 1974, the board of Tung Wah group decided to reconstruct the garden of the Tung Wah Coffin Home into a place for storing cremains since some of the room clusters were too old to be repaired. This provided 900 shrines for citizens to place their ancestors' cremains. Later in 1982, another group of room clusters were rebuilt into a massive hall for cremains, and this provided around 5,800 shrines to accomplish the need of the citizens.

As the demand for the depository service diminished in recent years, the compound gradually deteriorated. However, a large-scale repair and conservation project was carried out to restore the Coffin Home from 2002 to 2004 so that the respective historical appearance of the compound could be preserved.

Currently, the Coffin Home has an area of approximately 6,050 square meters consisting of different architectural buildings including a garden, a gateway, a pagoda, 91 rooms and 2 halls.

In 2005, the project won the UNESCO Asia-Pacific Heritage Award (Award of Merit). Moreover, it received the award of Honor in Heritage Preservation and Conservation Awards offered by the Antiquities and Monuments Office under the government of HKSAR.

- 1875 – Establishment of Coffin Home at Kennedy Town near a slaughter house
- 1899 – Relocation in Sandy Bay, new management under the Tung Wah Group of Hospitals and renamed as Tung Wah Coffin Home
- 1913 – First reconstruction
- 1926 – Expansion of Tung Wah Coffin Home, Bing Yan Hall built
- 1947 – Proposal to change use of room clusters
- 1948 – Reconstruction
- 1951 – Reconstruction
- 1957 – Reconstruction
- 1961 – Bing Yan Hall rebuilt for the use of sanatorium, Yut Yuet Hall built to replace Bing Yan Hall
- 1974 – Reconstruction of the Tung Wah Coffin Home garden into a storage place of cremains
- 1981 – Proposal to build another building for storing cremains
- 1982 – Room clusters built for storing cremains
- 2003 – Phrase 1 restoration started from January to March and Phrase 2 restoration started from November
- 2004 – Phase 2 restoration till March
- 2005 – Won the UNESCO (Asia-Pacifica Heritage Award) and received the award of Honor in Heritage Preservation and Conservation Awards

=== Important figures ===
A number of well known figures have had their ashes or body reposed in the Tung Wah Coffin Home, including Cai Yuan Pei (蔡元培), the previous vice-chancellor of Peking University; Chen Jiong Ming (陳炯明), a revolutionary figure in the early periods of the Republic of China; famous merchant Lin Bai Xin (林百欣) and Chow Kwen Lim (周君任), the founder of Chow Sang Sang Jewellery. Furthermore, Mr. Tang Kam Chi (鄧鑑之), one of the founders of the Tung Wah Group of Hospitals, and his wife have had their ashes kept in Tung Wah Coffin Home for more than 100 years.

== Burial practices in Hong Kong and New Territories ==
The burial practices in the urban areas of Hong Kong differ from the New Territories due to Hong Kong's congestion and limited space for burial grounds.

=== Hong Kong ===
Families in Hong Kong prefer to remove the body from the home as soon as possible after death; therefore, either an undertaker or a staff member from the funeral parlor will offer services to remove the body.

An undertaker or funeral director prepares the body in the home of the deceased with make-up and new clothes and shoes that family members buy to represent the start of a new life. The undertaker supplies a coffin, places the body in the coffin, and brings it to the cemetery or a Government cemetery depot to be held overnight. Relatives may then hold a farewell ceremony or perform final rites at the depot.

On the other hand, funeral parlor staff may retrieve the body in a stretcher or basket woven container from the home of the deceased to the cemetery.

==== Funeral parlor protocol on funeral day ====
In the funeral parlor, the last rites typically last until noontime. The body is encoffined in a farewell room where immediate relatives dress in white costumes during the vigil and funeral; colourful clothing is forbidden. Women wear a white skirt with a sack-like top, while men wear white gowns with a white band tied around the forehead. The coffin is placed in the front of the room for a 'last glance,' and is half open exposing the upper portion of the deceased's body. The farewell room is lit and filled with incense sticks and candles, creating a somber environment.

Relatives and friends of the deceased offer their respects to the deceased by bowing three times towards the coffin and once towards the primary mourners. In the past, gongs would be used throughout the ceremony and female widows would grieve loudly through wailing and cries to ward off the potential evil spirits. Relatives then accompany a motor hearse in transporting the body throughout the neighbourhood to the cemetery or crematorium, with funeral bands and large silver and blue wicker frames describing the deceased.

At the cemetery, the coffin is lowered while each family member throws a handful of earth while the hole is filled in. After the filling, paper money, peeled oranges, as well as lit candles and incense sticks are placed at the head of the grave. Finally, fire crackers are set off to close the last rites.

=== New Territories ===
Instead of funeral parlors and undertakers, kinsmen take the responsibility of burying the deceased. Two stages of burial take place in the New Territories: initial burial, and subsequent disinterment and re-interment of the remains. Relatives of the deceased sustain a vigil outside the home, and then bury the body in a traditional village area with a small stone at the head of the grave. After approximately five years, the bones of the body are exhumed, cleaned, and placed in either a funerary urn or a formal horseshoe-shaped stonework grave. In the funerary urn, the bones are carefully arranged in a sitting position, resembling the Buddhist lotus position posture. In a horseshoe grave, the remains are buried in a jar in front of a stone plaque with information describing the deceased. The placement of the remains in a funerary urn or horseshoe grave depends on the sex and standing of the deceased, as well as the financial state of the relatives.

=== Worshipping festivals ===
Two significant worshipping festivals in both urban areas and New Territories include Qingming Festival (清明節) and Double Ninth Festival (重九節), also known as the Chung Yeung Festival. During these festivals, families typically gather and make a visit to the relative's graves. At the gravesite, family members present pork, fruits, flowers, rice wine, cakes, and light incense and candles, as well as burn paper money. Family members take turns bowing before the tomb of the ancestors, starting with the oldest to the youngest family members. The family members will then feast on the food and drinks they brought for the ancestors.

== Coffin Home function ==
From the 19th century to the early 20th century, many Chinese people travelled to other countries in North and South America, or to South East Asian countries in search of jobs and better opportunities.

Many traditional Chinese individuals hoped to be buried in their birthplaces after their deaths. This was made possible by the facilities and services offered by the Coffin Home even if the dead bodies were overseas. As Hong Kong was located at a favourable transportation position, it soon became the central spot for people to travel back to their homeland from other countries.

At that time, it was very common for people to ask for help from Tung Wah Coffin Home, where the Coffin Home would transport the dead bodies back to their birthplaces for proper burial. Temporary depository of coffin was also made available when the bereaved wished to look for a better burial place for the dead.

== Architecture typology ==
The Tung Wah Coffin Home started in 1899 from the humble beginnings of a temporary shed, and transformed into the complex buildings that represent some of the best and archetypal Hong Kong architecture through the ages, including Vernacular Architecture, Colonial Architecture, a traditional Chinese Gateway and Pagoda. It comprises various buildings such as ossariums, halls and rooms with diverse architectural style of different periods. The entrance to the Main Reception Hall is rich in Chinese adornment, with two classical Roman Doric Order pillars standing boldly on two sides. The reception room has a colonial flat roof and a Chinese wall, while other rooms have British blinds. The Old Hall has retained the architectural merits of 1920s Hong Kong. The historic buildings were restored with traditional local knowledge and conservation techniques.

=== 6 major building areas ===
==== New Hall ====
The New Hall is one of the major buildings at the Coffin Home, which best represents the architectural feature of the mixture of both western and Chinese styles. The two Roman Doric poles represents western style, while the gate, Chinese tablet and gatepost couplet represents common Chinese rural fashion.

==== Ning, Hong and Sou Rooms ====
These two rooms are more than a century old, which hold the longest history in the Coffin Home. A typical typology of traditional Vernacular Architecture is displayed with characteristics of brick walls, tilted roofs, strips of wood and Chinese clay tiles.

==== Yut Yuet Hall (日月莊) Tien, On and Git Rooms ====
This two areas are both characterised with mixed architectural styles which merge traditional Chinese architectural style with colonial flattop style.

==== Reception Hall, Two Corridor Porticos and Old Hall ====
Reception Hall: Doors and windows with a strong tropical tone highlights the Colonial Architecture style of the Old Hall. Double layers of British blinds and grille windows are applied.

Two Corridor Porticos: Corridor Porticos are a group of small rooms with an elegant colonial style of shutters and doors.

==== Ossarium ====
Ossariums were later built during 1970–1980s which represent typical typology of that era.

==== Pagoda ====
Typical Chinese traditional architecture.

== Devotion to the society and history ==
For well over a century, Tung Wah Coffin Home has been, and still is, used for its original purpose, providing facilities for the temporary storage of coffins and urns waiting for transfer to the respective native places of the deceased. Taking care of those who died without means of proper burial has been one of the services provided by the Tung Wah Group of Hospitals.

== The repair and conservation project ==
Now largely in disuse, the Home has undergone a recent restoration, for which an award was given by the Hong Kong Government's Antiquities and Monuments Office. In 2005, the restoration and preservation work was honoured with a Heritage Award by UNESCO.

The major restoration project to the Tung Wah Coffin Home, started in 2003 in 2 phases spanning a total of 11 months, was carried out with the objectives of restoring the whole compound to its traditional architectural appearance, which bears distinctive features across different sections, and brings the building clusters to meet modern safety standards.

=== Before and after ===
All the following pictures were adopted from Tung Wah Coffin Home webpage:

=== Purpose of the restoration work ===
The restoration work was conducted with purposes from three main aspects. First, the restoration work could preserve architectures with cultural and historical value in terms of the local Hong Kong history. Second, it could bring out the uniqueness of different architecture typologies with specific historical backgrounds. Third, renovation and maintenance would be done to fulfill safety standards.

The restoration project has successfully preserved the Coffin Home as an important heritage in Hong Kong that not only demonstrates Tung Wah's philanthropic spirit and its role in the territory's history, but also embraces the changes in culture and burial customs of the Chinese community over the centuries.

=== Project summary ===
Restoration Works of Tung Wah Coffin Home
Owner	Tung Wah Group of Hospitals
Duration	Phase 1 January 2003 ~ March 2003, Phase 2 November 2003~ March 2004
Budget	HK$10,000,000

=== Awards ===
1. Award of Honor, Hong Kong Heritage Awards (2004), Heritage Preservation and Conservation Awards

Comments from adjudicators (The Antiquities and Monuments Office): “The Coffin Home demonstrates excellence in conservation practice applied to a group of historical buildings. By restoring the historical buildings with traditional local knowledge and exceptional conservation techniques, the Coffin Home is successful in preserving a significant architectural typology in the Asia–Pacific region, and thereby protecting an important chapter of the history of the overseas Chinese.”

2. Award of Merit, 2005 UNESCO Asia-Pacific Heritage Awards for Cultural Heritage Conservation

Comments from adjudicators (UNESCO): “The project was praised for preserving a unique building typology and an important cultural institution which reflects the evolving social history of Hong Kong. The complex includes a range of building traditions spanning from vernacular Chinese architecture to modern buildings.”

== See also ==
- Conservation in Hong Kong
- List of the oldest buildings and structures in Hong Kong
- Architecture of Hong Kong
- Heritage conservation in Hong Kong

== Notes and references ==
- Chao, Sheau-yueh J. (2006), "Sources on overseas Chinese studies : genealogical records ".S.L. : Elsevier.
- "Guide to architecture in Hong Kong". Hong Kong: Pace Pub. Ltd., 1988
- "Overseas Chinese in Asia between the two World Wars", Overseas Chinese Archives, Centre for Contemporary Asian Studies, the Chinese University of Hong Kong, c1989.
- Wang, Gungwu (1994), "The status of overseas Chinese studies". San Francisco, Calif. : Chinese Historical Society of America.
- Yung, Hiu Kwan (2007), "Architectural heritage conservation in Hong Kong". Thesis (Ph.D.) University of Hong Kong.
- Yie, Ming Han (2009), "Dong hua yi zhuang yu huan qiu ci shan wang luo: dang an wen xian zi liao yin zheng yu qi shi(東華義莊與環球慈善網絡：檔案文獻資料印證與啟示)". Hong Kong: Joint Publishing (Hong Kong) Ltd, 1st Edition.
