= Bā Prefecture =

Imperial China zhou prefecture

Bazhou or Ba Prefecture (巴州) was a zhou (prefecture) in imperial China in modern Bazhong, Sichuan, China. It existed (intermittently) from 514 to 1913.

Bazhou District in Bazhong retains its name.

== Geography ==
The administrative region of Ba Prefecture in the Tang dynasty is in modern Bazhong in northeastern Sichuan. It probably includes parts of modern:

- Bazhou District
- Pingchang County

== See also ==
- Qinghua Commandery
