= Qiantang, Guangdong =

Qiantang
- 乾塘镇
- Location within Guangdong Location within China
- Coordinates: 21.23259°N 110.60717°E
- Country: People's Republic of China
- Province: Guangdong
- City: Zhanjiang
- District: Potou District

Area
  - Total: 53 km^{2} (20 sq mi)

Population (2008)
  - Total: 37,650
- Time zone: UTC+8 (China Standard Time)

Qiantang is a town in Potou District, Zhanjiang, Guangdong, China.
