= Qiantang, Chongqing =

Qiantang 钱塘镇
- Town
- Qiantang Town
- Location within Chongqing Location within China
- Coordinates: 30.18468°N 106.31571°E
- Country: People's Republic of China
- Municipality: Chongqing
- District: Hechuan District

Area
  - Total: 134.15 km^{2} (51.80 sq mi)

Population (2001)
  - Total: 67,256
- Time zone: UTC+8 (China Standard Time)

Qiantang is a town in Hechuan District, Chongqing, China.

== See also ==
- List of township-level divisions of Chongqing
