= Coffin home =

Temporary depository for corpses

A coffin home (simplified Chinese: 义庄; traditional Chinese: 義莊; pinyin: yìzhuāng; Cantonese Yale: yih-jōng; Japanese: gisō (義荘)) is a temporary coffin depository where the coffins containing the cadavers of recently deceased people are temporarily stored while awaiting transport to the place of burial. The term is also loosely used to refer to bedspace apartments.

Yih-jong (義莊) literally means "mansion of righteousness" and originally referred to any charitable organization. These charities were typically established by prominent families to promote their standing in the community. The designation yih-jong was first used by Fan's Yih-Jong (范氏義莊), established by Song dynasty imperial chancellor Fan Zhongyan in his hometown Suzhou. Emulating Fan's model, many prominent families founded yih-jongs between the Song and Qing dynasties to support their clansmen and local communities, offering charitable services such as orphanages, free schools, disaster relief, and mortuaries.

The name yih-jong eventually became a euphemism for "coffin home" or "morgue" by the late 19th century. This is because they were the de facto undertakers of dead people whose next of kin could not be found or were too poor to afford funeral services, and provided temporary storage and transport of the coffins and bodies of emigrants who desired burial in their place of origin. The establishment of Tung Wah Coffin Home in Hong Kong in 1875, named "Tung Wah Yih Jong" (東華義莊) in Cantonese Chinese, firmly entrenched this euphemistic use.

Coffin homes are primarily found in Greater China and places with substantial overseas Chinese populations. Most coffins that pass through the care of a coffin home are those of migrant workers who die in their place of work but who desired burial in their home villages. Coffin homes also provide temporary storage for deceased persons who are unable to afford a funeral or whose relatives cannot be located.
