= Hezhou (Chongqing) =

Historical division in Chongqing, China

Hezhou or He Prefecture (合州) was a zhou (prefecture) in imperial China centering on modern Hechuan District, Chongqing, China. It existed (intermittently) from 556 to 1913.

== Geography ==
The administrative region of Hezhou in the Tang dynasty is in modern western Chongqing on the border with Sichuan. It probably includes parts of modern:

- Under the administration of Chongqing:
  - Hechuan District
  - Tongliang District
  - Dazu District
- Under the administration of Guang'an, Sichuan:
  - Wusheng County
