= Lizhou Circuit =

- Chinese: 利州路
Transcriptions
Standard Mandarin
- Hanyu Pinyin: Lìzhōu Lù

Lizhou Circuit or Lizhou Province was one of the major circuits during the Song dynasty. It was split from Xichuan Circuit in 1001.

In 1144 it was split into Lizhou East Circuit and Lizhou West Circuit. The 2 smaller circuits rejoined in 1168, split again in 1175, rejoined again in 1176, split again in 1178, rejoined again in 1194, split again in 1196, rejoined again in 1210, and split again in 1218.

Its administrative area corresponds to roughly the modern provinces of northern Sichuan, southern Shaanxi and southern Gansu.
