= Pu Prefecture (Sichuan) =

Historical administrative division in Sichuan, China

- Chinese: 普州
Transcriptions
Standard Mandarin
- Hanyu Pinyin: Pǔ Zhōu
- Wade–Giles: P'u^{3} Chou^{1}

Puzhou or Pu Prefecture was a zhou (prefecture) in Imperial China, centering on modern Anyue County, Sichuan. It existed intermittently from 575 to 1376.

== Geography ==
The administrative region of Pu Prefecture in the Song dynasty is in modern eastern Sichuan, which borders Chongqing. It probably includes parts of modern:

- Under the administration of Ziyang:
  - Anyue County
  - Lezhi County
- Under the administration of Suining:
  - Suining

== See also ==
- Anyue Commandery
