= Miyun Yuanwu =

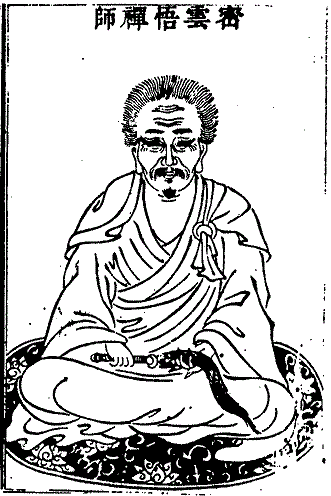
- An Image of Miyun Yuanwu
- Title: Chan Master (禅師)

Personal life
- Born: 1566 Changzhou, Jiangsu
- Died: 1642 (aged 75–76)

Religious life
- Religion: Buddhist
- Denomination: Linji Chan
- Creed: Chan
- Ordination: 1594

Senior posting
- Disciple of: Huanyou Zhengchuan
- Disciples: Feiyin Tongrong, Hanyue Fazang, Muchen Daomin, Poshan Haiming

Miyun Yuanwu (Chinese: 密雲圓悟, pinyin: Mìyún Yuánwù; Japanese: 密雲円悟, Hepburn: Mitsuun Engo; 1566–1642) was a prominent Chinese Chan master of the Linji tradition. Born in Changzhou, in modern Jiangsu Province, to a prominent family, and was educated as a Confucian. In 1594, after reading the Platform Sutra of the Sixth Patriarch, he left his wife and children and immediately ordained under master Huanyou Zhengchua of Yuwang Monastery in Changzhou. In 1603, his master left for Beijing and left him in charge of the monastery. At that time, he is said to have attained sudden awakening, and in the next decade became famous for his distinctive development of Chan teaching methods, reviving the "beating and shouting" of Linji.

== Career ==
In 1611, Miyun received Dharma transmission from his master, Huanyou, and became the abbot of Longchiyuan Temple in 1614. Additionally, he became the abbot of Tongxuan Temple on Mount Tiantai (1623), Guanghui Temple in Zhejiang (1624), and was additionally the abbot of Guangli Temple on Mount Yuwang, Daobaoen Temple in Jinleng (modern Nanjing), and Jinge Temple on Mount Tiantong (popularly known as Tiantong Temple), for which he received the secondary name Master Tiantong.

In addition to rebuilding Tiantong Temple in 1641, which had been damaged in a flood in 1587, his work publishing popular Chan gazetteers attracted a wide following. For instance, 1638, it was observed that the once decrepit Tiantong Temple was then home to 1500 monks and laity. For the feeding of this population, the immense "Wok for a Thousand Monks" was cast in 1641.

Minyun had an immense intergenerational influence. This was ensured by Miyun's intentional appointment of his own Dharma heirs as abbots within his lineage, who carried on the same practice. Miyun, having simultaneously been abbot of six temples, is regarded as having largely revived Chan, which had been on decline since the Yuan (1271–1368), and in particular, the power and popularity of the Linji Chan tradition.

== Lineage and influence ==
Miyun had a total of five direct Dharma heirs, and twelve in his direct lineage, who rotated abbacy of Tiantong Temple after his death in 1642:

- 1. Muchen Daomin (木陳道忞; 1596–1674), term: 1642–1645
- 2. Feiyin Tongrong (費隱通容; 1593–1661), term: 1645–1648.
- 3. Linye Tongqi (林野通奇; 1595–1652), term: 1648–1652
- 4. Muyun Tong (牧雲通門; 1599–1671), term: 1652–1654
- 5. Fushi Tongxian (浮石通賢; 1593–1667), term: 1654–1657
- (1). Muchen Daomin (木陳道忞; 1596–1674), second term: 1657–1659; Muchen Daomin's Dharma heirs:
  - 6. Yuan'an Benfang (遠庵本豐; 1622–1682), term: 1659–1671
  - 7. Shanxiao Benxi (山曉本皙; 1620–1686), term 1672–1686; Shanxiao Benxi's Dharma heirs:
    - 8. Baitang Chaojing (柏堂超靜), term 1686–1688
    - 9. Weihong Yuansheng (慰弘元盛), term 1688–1696
  - 10. Tianyue Benzhou (天岳本晝; 1621–1705), term 1696–1705 (Daomin's Dharma heir). Tianyue's Dharma heir:
    - 11. Weizai Chaocheng (偉哉超乘; 1651–1724), term 1705–1712

Since these monks will have made their names by being abbots of Tiantong temple, Jiang Wu suggests that their subsequent appointments to other prominent temples throughout China helped to spread Miyun's legacy in the early Qing. Moreover, prior to Feiyin Tongrong's term as head of Tiantong temple, in 1637, while head of Liangfeng Monastery, he transmitted Dharma to Yinyuan Longqi (隱元隆琦, Japanese: Ingen Ryūki, 1592–1673), the founder of the Ōbaku sect of Japanese Zen. Yinyuan went on to found Manpukuji in Uji, Japan, and incorporated Miyun's model of Dharma lineage and transmission into his Dharma rules, the Ōbaku Pure Rules.

Miyun's interpretation of Linji was also transmitted to Vietnam through Shouzun Yuanzhao (壽尊源昭; 1647–1729), a student of Guangyuan Benkao, one of Muchen Daomin's disciples. In 1665 he transmitted the Dharma to Vietnam, founding the Yuanzhao (源昭; Vietnamese: Nguyên-Thiêu) lineage of Linji Chan (Vietnamese: Lâm-Tê), the source of modern Thiên Buddhism.

== Works ==
In contrast to the Four Eminent Monks of the Wanli Era, Miyun's teaching style was not based on literary accomplishments or scholarship, such as sūtra commentation. Rather, his teachings consisted of classic Chan aphorisms and deeds which were collated the following collection:

- The Record of the Sayings of Master Miyun (密雲禪師語錄), JA158.
