= Hechuan, Chongqing =

Hechuan 合川区
- District
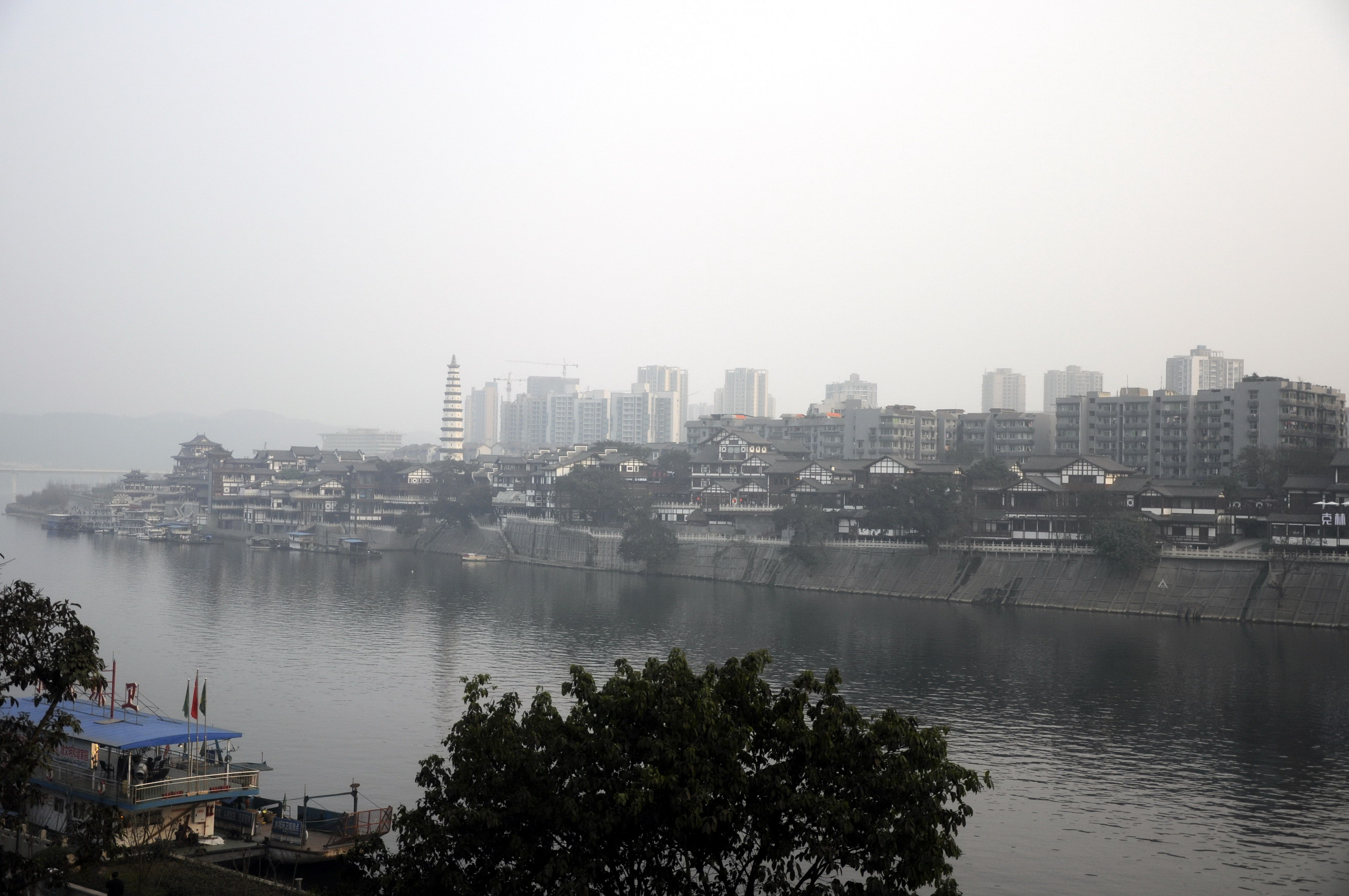
- A review of Hechuan city at the meeting point of Jialing River and Fu River

- Hechuan District in Chongqing
- Interactive map of Hechuan
- Location of the district seat in Chongqing
- Coordinates: 29°58′19″N 106°16′34″E
- Country: People's Republic of China
- Municipality: Chongqing

Area
  - Total: 2,356.21 km^{2} (909.74 sq mi)

Population (2020)
  - Total: 1,245,294
  - Density: 528.516/km^{2} (1,368.85/sq mi)
- Time zone: UTC+8 (China Standard)
- Website: www.hc.gov.cn

Hechuan (Chinese: 合川; pinyin: Héchuān) is a district in the northern part of Chongqing Municipality, People's Republic of China. Located at the meeting point of the Jialing, Fu and Qu rivers, it has a history of 1,500 years. Hechuan is 54 km (34 mi) away from downtown Chongqing's Yuzhong District.

Hechuan was formerly a county-level city but was incorporated into Chongqing as a district in 2006.

== Administration ==
Name	Chinese (S)	Hanyu Pinyin	Population (2010)	Area (km^{2})
Heyangcheng Subdistrict	合阳城街道	Héyángchéng Jiēdào	186,242	38.4
Diaoyucheng Subdistrict	钓鱼城街道	Diàoyúchéng Jiēdào	47,205	61.7
Nanjin Avenue Subdistrict	南津街街道	Nánjīnjiē Jiēdào	143,766	95.3
Yanjing Subdistrict	盐井街道	Yánjǐng Jiēdào	24,680	58.66
Caojie Subdistrict	草街街道	Cǎojiē Jiēdào	44,237	96.28
Yunmen Subdistrict	云门街道	Yúnmén Jiēdào	68,698	134.21
Dashi Subdistrict	大石街道	Dàshí Jiēdào	61,426	122.86
Shayu town	沙鱼镇	Shāyú Zhèn	10,117	22.64
Guandu town	官渡镇	Guāndù Zhèn	24,913	57.57
Laitan town	涞滩镇	Láitān Zhèn	24,431	79.49
Xiaojia town	肖家镇	Xiàojiā Zhèn	16,363	29.78
Gulou town	古楼镇	Gǔlóu Zhèn	19,447	61.71
Sanmiao town	三庙镇	Sānmiào Zhèn	35,877	73.71
Erlang town	二郎镇	Èrláng Zhèn	17,295	38.1
Longfeng town	龙凤镇	Lóngfèng Zhèn	20,334	61.26
Longxing town	隆兴镇	Lóngxìng Zhèn	28,746	87.14
Tongxi town	铜溪镇	Tóngxī Zhèn	29,699	85.36
Shuangfeng town	双凤镇	Shuāngfèng Zhèn	33,282	90.28
Shitan town	狮滩镇	Shītān Zhèn	19,375	58
Qingping town	清平镇	Qīngpíng Zhèn	21,160	54.3
Tuchang town	土场镇	Tǔchǎng Zhèn	17,221	41.2
Xiaomian town	小沔镇	Xiǎomiǎn Zhèn	27,154	57.81
Sanhui town	三汇镇	Sānhuì Zhèn	51,413	88.48
Xianglong town	香龙镇	Xiānglóng Zhèn	25,006	64
Qiantang town	钱塘镇	Qiántáng Zhèn	65,894	134.15
Longshi town	龙市镇	Lóngshì Zhèn	56,142	121.02
Yanwo town	燕窝镇	Yànwō Zhèn	30,424	71.19
Taihe town	太和镇	Tàihé Zhèn	66,506	193.35
Weituo town	渭沱镇	Wèituó Zhèn	36,068	100.47
Shuanghuai town	双槐镇	Shuānghuái Zhèn	39,907	97.81

== Climate ==
Climate data for Hechuan, elevation 231 m (758 ft), (1991–2020 normals, extremes 1981–2010)
Month	Jan	Feb	Mar	Apr	May	Jun	Jul	Aug	Sep	Oct	Nov	Dec	Year
Record high °C (°F)	17.9 (64.2)	24.4 (75.9)	33.3 (91.9)	35.9 (96.6)	37.2 (99.0)	37.6 (99.7)	40.4 (104.7)	42.7 (108.9)	42.5 (108.5)	35.1 (95.2)	26.9 (80.4)	18.9 (66.0)	42.7 (108.9)
Mean daily maximum °C (°F)	10.0 (50.0)	13.2 (55.8)	18.1 (64.6)	23.6 (74.5)	27.1 (80.8)	29.4 (84.9)	33.1 (91.6)	33.2 (91.8)	28.3 (82.9)	21.9 (71.4)	17.0 (62.6)	11.2 (52.2)	22.2 (71.9)
Daily mean °C (°F)	7.1 (44.8)	9.6 (49.3)	13.5 (56.3)	18.6 (65.5)	22.1 (71.8)	24.9 (76.8)	28.1 (82.6)	27.8 (82.0)	23.7 (74.7)	18.4 (65.1)	13.7 (56.7)	8.6 (47.5)	18.0 (64.4)
Mean daily minimum °C (°F)	5.1 (41.2)	7.2 (45.0)	10.4 (50.7)	15.0 (59.0)	18.6 (65.5)	21.6 (70.9)	24.4 (75.9)	24.0 (75.2)	20.6 (69.1)	16.2 (61.2)	11.6 (52.9)	6.9 (44.4)	15.1 (59.2)
Record low °C (°F)	−1.9 (28.6)	0.0 (32.0)	−0.3 (31.5)	5.7 (42.3)	9.5 (49.1)	14.5 (58.1)	18.0 (64.4)	17.5 (63.5)	13.4 (56.1)	6.9 (44.4)	2.8 (37.0)	−1.8 (28.8)	−1.9 (28.6)
Average precipitation mm (inches)	18.7 (0.74)	22.1 (0.87)	48.8 (1.92)	95.5 (3.76)	151.8 (5.98)	198.6 (7.82)	165.5 (6.52)	135.4 (5.33)	128.0 (5.04)	97.6 (3.84)	48.6 (1.91)	23.6 (0.93)	1,134.2 (44.66)
Average precipitation days (≥ 0.1 mm)	10.1	9.5	11.5	13.3	15.9	16.1	11.9	11.8	12.9	16.4	12.3	10.2	151.9
Average snowy days	0.4	0.2	0	0	0	0	0	0	0	0	0	0.2	0.8
Average relative humidity (%)	89	85	81	81	82	85	80	78	83	89	89	89	84
Mean monthly sunshine hours	34.5	48.3	98.4	130.1	137.5	131.3	205.6	198.7	130.0	69.1	55.4	28.5	1,267.4
Percentage possible sunshine	11	15	27	34	32	31	48	49	35	20	18	9	27
Source: China Meteorological Administration
