= Military history of the Song dynasty =

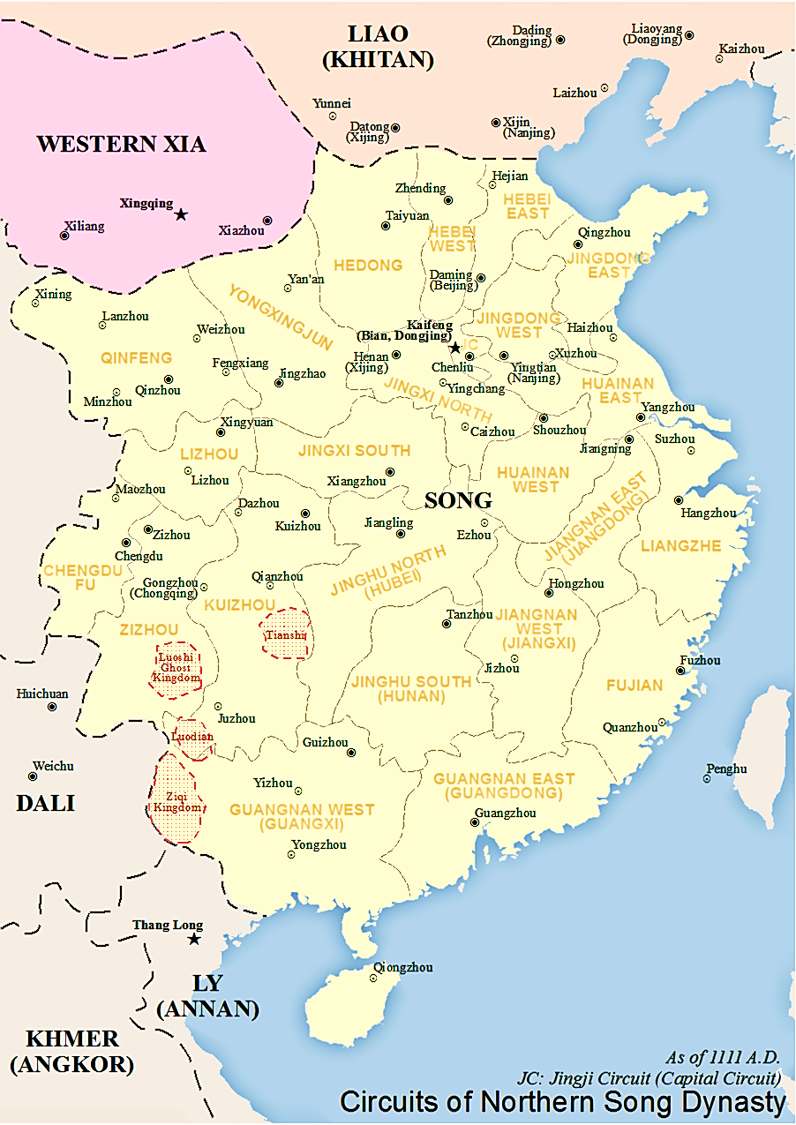
Northern Song (960–1127)

Southern Song (1127–1279)

The military history of the Song dynasty encompasses military activity of the Han Chinese state of Song from 960 AD with the overthrow of Later Zhou until 1279 AD when China was conquered by the Mongol-led Yuan dynasty.

== Northern Song ==
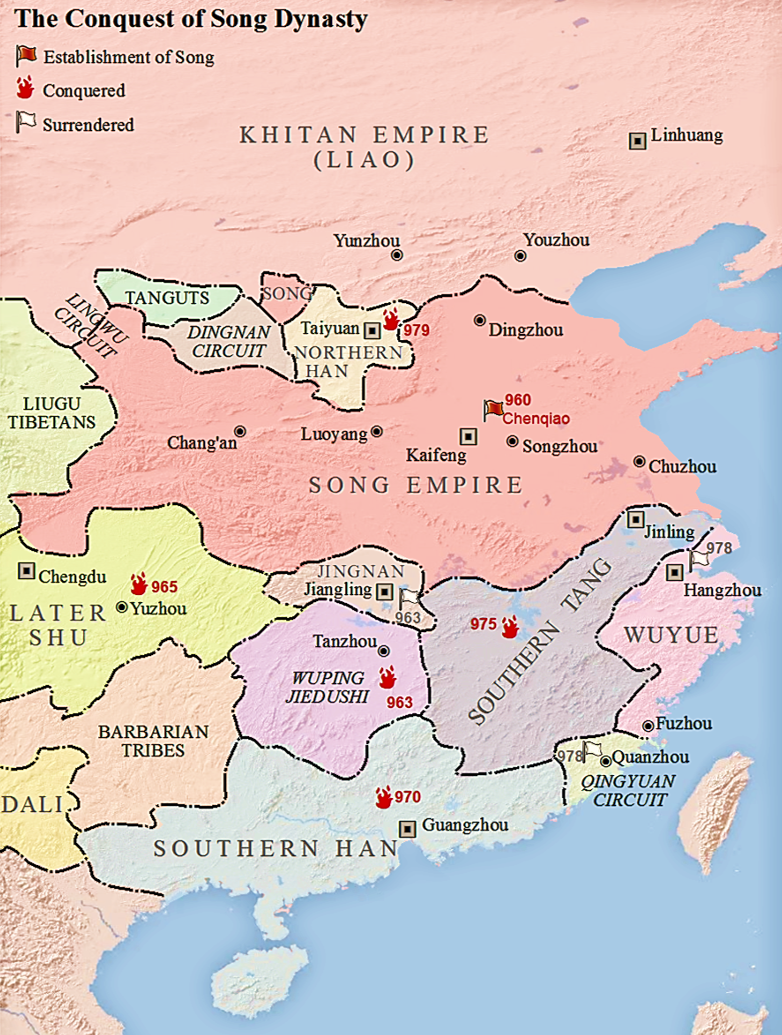
Song dynasty's conquest of China

=== Taizu (r. 960–975) ===
Emperor Taizu of Song (r. 960–975), Zhao Kuangyin, was commander-in-chief of the capital guards and jiedushi of Songzhou in the Later Zhou dynasty. In 960 he was dispatched by the Grand Chancellor Fan Zhi to fight against Northern Han and the Khitans. When Zhao's army reached Chenqiao Station, his soldiers proclaimed him emperor, and the administration of Kaifeng accepted his authority. Resistance from the provincial commanders Li Yun and Li Chongjin were suppressed by Zhao's generals Murong Yanzhao and Han Lingkun. Afterwards, Zhao took over the imperial guard and dismissed all his generals with honors, gaining complete control over the former territory of Later Zhou.

On 960/1/1, Zhen and Ding prefectures reported by express courier that Liu Chengjun in Taiyuan had joined with the Khitan and invaded across the border. And so Taizu was ordered to lead a large force on a northern expedition against them. The next day, the Palace Attendant Zhan Jurun held a farewell banquet for the departing army on the outskirts of the city. At the time there were many rumors in the capital of a plan to make the inspector general [i.e. Taizu] the Son of Heaven. When the soldiers reached Chen Bridge post-station, they deliberated together and decided to support Taizu. The next day, as they assembled at the post-station gate, suddenly all the officers came together and said, “We brave death in battle a thousand times to defeat the enemies of the state. But the Son of Heaven is a now a small child. Let’s first make the inspector general the Son of Heaven, and then proceed on the northern expedition.” Because he had consumed much food and drink at the farewell banquet, Taizu was sleeping drunk in his chamber and so was unaware of their plans. The next morning, the soldiers, with swords drawn, pounded on the bedroom door, and together they dragged him out into the main hall where they clothed him in a yellow robe. The officers saluted him and said, “We soldiers have no ruler.We wish to make you the Son of Heaven.” Then they shouted out rounds of “Long Life” to the Emperor, and the sound could be heard for miles around. Taizu cursed them, but they would not relent. They crowded around Taizu, put him on a horse, and headed back to the capital. But Taizu drew up his reins and said to the officers, “I have accepted an order to proceed north, but you have decided to support me. If I issue an order, will you obey?” And they all said, “We await your order.” Then Taizu said, “I have served the Empress and His Highness loyally. The court officials are my colleagues. Do not violate the palace or disturb the officials. These days, when rulers raise troops against a city, they allow the troops to loot and pillage. Do not sack this city nor loot its treasury. If you follow my orders, I will richly reward you. If you disobey, I will execute all of you.” The officers saluted and received his order, and in strict formations they entered through the Gate of Benevolence and Harmony.

— Eastern Capital Miscellany, a 12th century account of the rise of Song Taizu

Emperor Taizu then set about conquering the various states of the Ten Kingdoms. Jingnan fell in 963, Meng Chang surrendered Later Shu in 965, Liu Chang surrendered Southern Han in 970, and Southern Tang fell in 975. Campaigns against Northern Han were launched in 968 and 969, but Song forces were unable to breach the fortifications of Taiyuan.

In 969, gunpowder propelled fire arrows, rocket arrows, were invented by Yue Yifang and Feng Jisheng.

In 974, the Mo clan of Nandan submitted to Song authority

In 975, the state of Wuyue sent a group of soldiers skilled in the use of fire arrows to the Song dynasty, which used fire arrows and incendiary bombs in the same year to destroy the fleet of Southern Tang.

Taizu did not live to see China unified. He died in 976 and was succeeded by his younger brother Zhao Guangyi, posthumously Emperor Taizong of Song.

=== Taizong (r. 976–997) ===
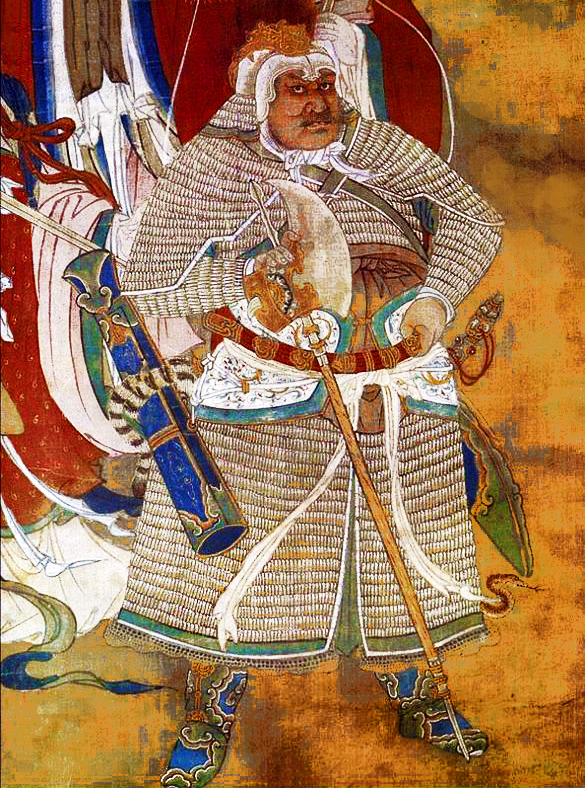
Song dynasty axe wielding warrior

Emperor Taizong of Song, Zhao Guangyi, finished the conquest of the remaining Ten Kingdoms. Qian Chu surrendered Wuyue in 978 and in 979, four Song armies under Pan Mei and Guo Jin marched on the capital of Northern Han, Taiyuan. The Khitans sent a relief force but were annihilated. So fell Northern Han.

In the southwest, the Song and their aboriginal allies in Guizhou attacked the Mu'ege Kingdom in 976, forcing them to retreat to Dafang County.

In 979, Taizong personally led an invasion of the Khitan Liao dynasty to retake the Sixteen Prefectures. He laid siege to Youzhou but was defeated by Khitan reinforcements led by Yelü Xiuge at the Battle of Gaoliang River.

In 980, Yang Ye and his son Yanlang (Yang Yanzhao) defeated a major Liao invasion, consisted of 100,000 troops, at the Yanmen Pass region. In 982, he scored yet again another victory; this time counterattacked Liao well into their controlled areas of the Shanxi region.

In 981, the Song invaded kingdom of Đại Cồ Việt with initial success but was ambushed and the campaign ended with Lê Hoàn accepting Song suzerainty.

In 982, Li Jipeng of the Dingnan Jiedushi surrendered to the Song, but his cousin Li Jiqian rebelled.

In 986, the Song attacked the Liao again. Song troops under Pan Mei, Cao Bin, and Yang Ye were defeated by a Liao army led personally by Empress Dowager Chengtian. Yang Ye was captured and died in captivity due to wound infection.

On 7 January 987, Tian Zhongjin invaded Liao territory and overran Qigouguan, but three days later, the Liao annihilated a ten thousand strong Song force at Junziguan. The commander of Bozhou, alerted by the Liao victory at Junziguan, hastily completed the city’s fortifications, gathered provisions and made all military preparations in anticipation of the Liao exploiting their victory to attack the city. The populace’s resentment against his measures evaporated when a Liao army decided to bypass the city because it was so well prepared. A Liao force then raided Daizhou, arriving beneath the prefectural seat’s walls. On 20 January, a Song army lured the Liao force into an ambush at Tudengbao, captured a son of the Liao Great Northern King, and beheaded more than two thousand men.

— Peter Lorge

In 988, Emperor Shengzong of Liao personally led an invasion of Song and successfully sacked many of the border regions before retreating in the spring of 989. The Song strengthened its border garrison in the summer with a large force. When the Liao next tried to raid Song territory by bypassing the stationed army, Song general Yin Jilun forced marched in pursuit and attacked them by surprise, shattering the Liao force.

In 993, Wang Xiaopo and Li Shun rebelled in Sichuan and were suppressed by 995.

In 994, the Song deposed Li Jiqian. The Liao attacked the Song and laid siege to Zitong with 100,000 troops. They were repelled with the aid of fire arrows.

Taizong died on 9 May 997, and was succeeded by his son, Zhao Heng, posthumously Emperor Zhenzong of Song.

=== Zhenzong (r. 997–1022) ===
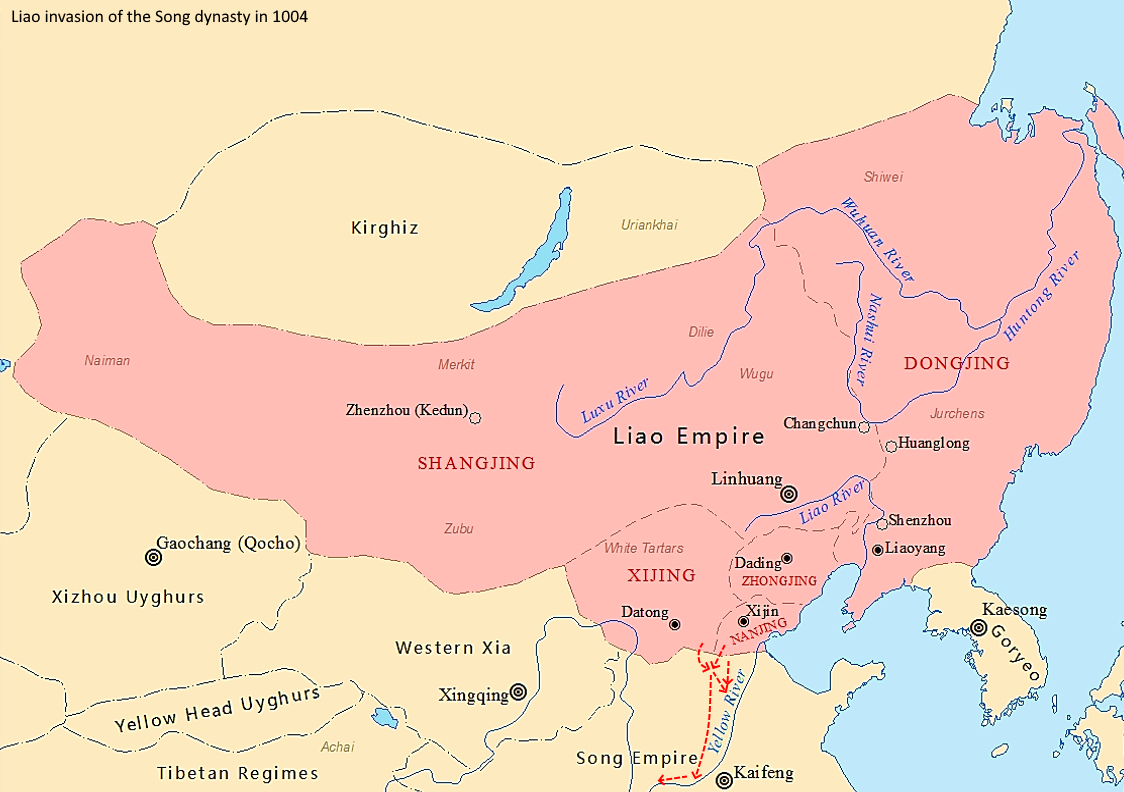
Liao dynasty invasion of Song in 1004

Emperor Zhenzong of Song did not have any stomach for war so he legitimized Li Jiqian and appeased the Tanguts to the northwest with gold, brocade, money and tea. Li Jiqian captured Lingzhou in 1002.

The Khitans immediately attacked in 998 but were forced to retreat in 1000 after failing to take key cities. They attacked again in 1001 and 1003 but were repulsed. Khitan aggression towards the Song culminated in a full-scale invasion in 1004 by Emperor Shengzong of Liao. Khitan forces penetrated as far as Chanzhou at the Yellow River, within striking distance of Kaifeng. Zhenzong, Yang Si, and Yang Yanzhao (Yanlang) marched the Song army north to meet the Khitans in combat. In January 1005, the Khitan general Xiao Dalin was killed by a giant crossbow, crippling the Khitan offensive. Peace negotiations commenced from 13 to 18 January. In the resulting peace treaty, known as the Chanyuan Treaty, the two sides agreed to delineate their current territorial boundaries and for the Song to make annual installments of 200,000 bolts of raw silk and 100,000 taels of silver to the Liao as tribute.

The civilian and military prefectures along the border shall each abide by the [present] territorial boundaries. The residents and householdsof the two realms shall not encroach on one another.
If there are robbers or bandits who flee arrest [across the border], neither side shall allow them to be given refuge.
As for furrowed fields and sowing and reaping, neither the north [i.e., Liao] nor the south [i.e., Sung] shall grant [their populations] licence to harass or disturb.
All walls and moats now in existence on either side may be kept and maintained as of old, and the dredging of moats and completion of repairs may all [continue] as before, but it shall not be permissible to initiate construction on [new] walls and moats or open or dig [new] river channels.

— Chanyuan Treaty

In 1000, Tang Fu demonstrated gunpowder pots and caltrops to the Song court and was rewarded. Trebuchets armed with bombs that behaved like flying fire were also mentioned, suggesting that they were incendiaries. In the same year, Zhuang rebels attacked Yongzhou but were defeated by Zhuang troops of the Song-allied Huang clan.

In 1001, Zhuang rebels calling themselves the Troops of Chen (chenbing) rebelled in Yizhou. Their leader, Su Chengzhun, was defeated three months later.

In 1002, Shi Pu demonstrated fireballs utilizing gunpowder to the Song court and blueprints were created for promulgation throughout the realm.

In 1004, a banquet was held for a Nong chieftain in Song territory, leading to military retaliation from Đại Cồ Việt.

Recently some border residents who long ago were abducted by the caitiffs [have fled back to Sung territory]. When during their flights they arrived at Yan, the [ethnic Chinese] people [of Yan] raised money for them] and gave them guidance for entering into Chinese territory. [These people of Yan] said [to them], “Be on your way. In a future year when the emperor of the Southern Court comes to recover Youzhou, take care to do us, the sons of Han, no harm.” The longings in the hearts of the people of Yan and Ji are such as these.

— Lu Zhen, a Song envoy who visited Liao in 1009, describing Chinese subjects fleeing to Song territory

In 1017, Đại Cồ Việt raided the Song dynasty.

Zhenzong died on 23 March 1022 and was succeeded by his son, Zhao Zhen, posthumously Emperor Renzong of Song. Empress Liu became regent.

=== Renzong (r. 1022–1063) ===
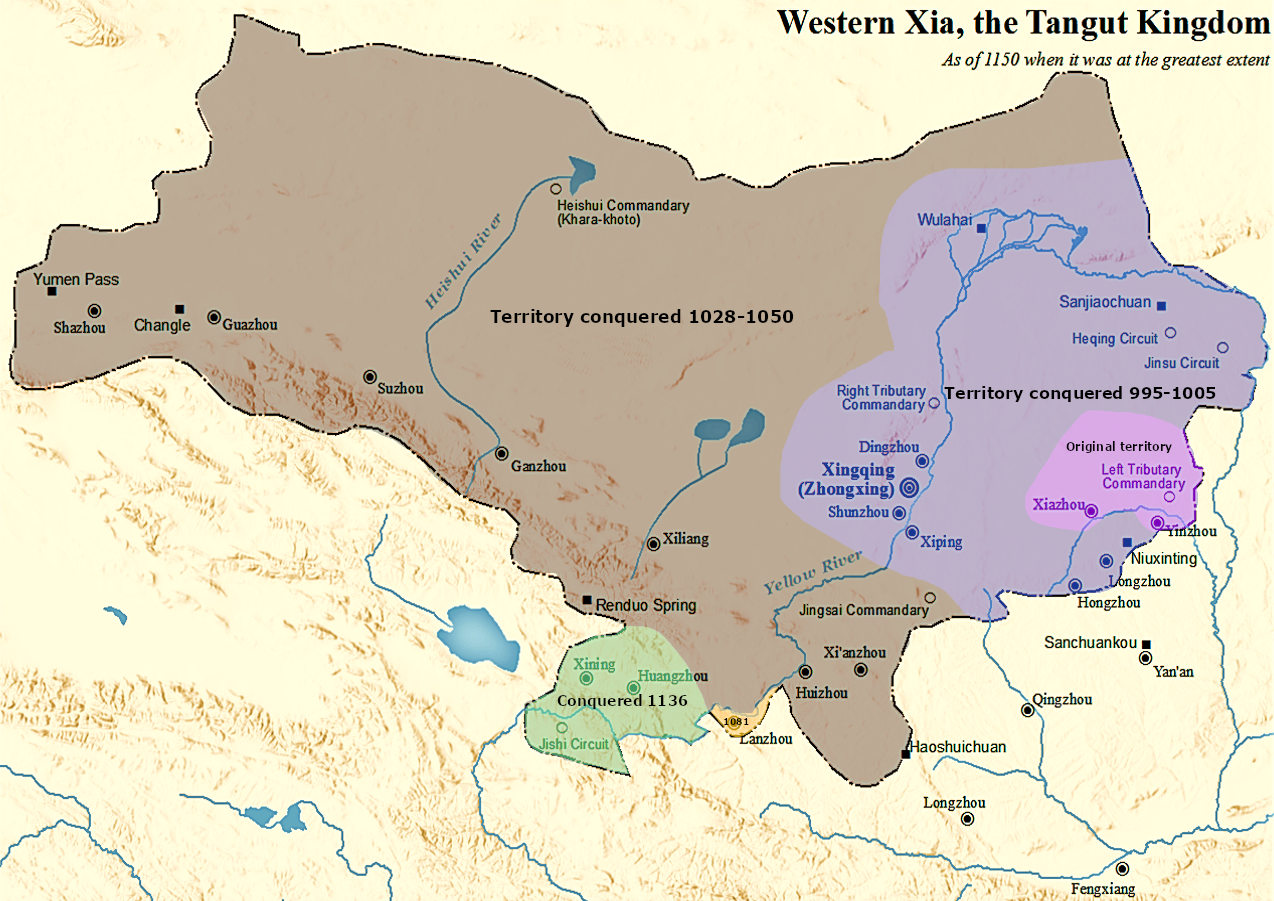
Expansion of Western Xia

Emperor Renzong of Song was still a child when his father died, so Empress Liu became regent, ruling in his stead for the next 12 years until she died. By the time he came to power, the Song military had been without any practical combat experience for decades.

In 1034, Li Yuanhao of the Tanguts raided Song dynasty

In 1036, Đại Cồ Việt raided the Song dynasty.

On 10 November 1038, Li Yuanhao declared himself Emperor Jingzong of Western Xia. In the same year, the Meng clan (Zhuang people) in Yizhou of Guangnan West Circuit rebelled and was suppressed

With the proclamation of their own dynasty, the Tanguts began a protracted campaign of military aggression against the Song, lasting six years until a truce was called in 1044. The Liao dynasty took advantage of the situation and attacked the Song as well. Although ultimately repelled, the Song agreed to increase annual tribute to 200,000 taels of silver and 300,000 bolts of silk.

By the time I went to the Northern Court, all the veteran generals and seasoned statesmen had passed away. The contemporary military men were ignorant of warfare and the soldiers did not know how to fight. What we could count on was the diplomatic missions we continuously sent to appease the enemies. Under such circumstances, it could not be said that we were doing something wrong, for if we insisted on a showdown with the enemy, the result could be unthinkably disastrous. Therefore, to increase the annual tribute for peace was the only thing we could do, although such an ignominious act was against my wish.

— Fu Bi, the Song diplomat sent to negotiate a peace with Liao in 1042

In 1043, the Yao people of Guiyang rebelled. It was only suppressed in 1051.

In 1044, Ou Xifan of the Ou clan rebelled in the northwest of Yizhou in Guangnan West Circuit. Ou Xifan declared the Great Tang and waged war on the Song. He was caught a year later and executed by vivisection. In the same year, the chemical formula for gunpowder appeared in the military manual Wujing Zongyao, also known as the Complete Essentials for the Military Classics. "Thunderclap bombs" and a "triple-bed-crossbow" firing fire arrows were also mentioned in the Wujing Zongyao.

In 1048, Wang Ze rebelled in Hebei and was suppressed.

In 1049, Nong Zhigao of the Zhuang people rebelled in Guangnan West Circuit. He was suppressed in 1053.

In 1055, Peng Shixi rebelled in Jinghu and was suppressed in 1058.

In 1058, rebellion broke out in Yongzhou and was suppressed in 1061.

Renzong died on 30 April 1063 and was succeeded by his cousin Zhao Zongshi, posthumously Emperor Yingzong of Song.

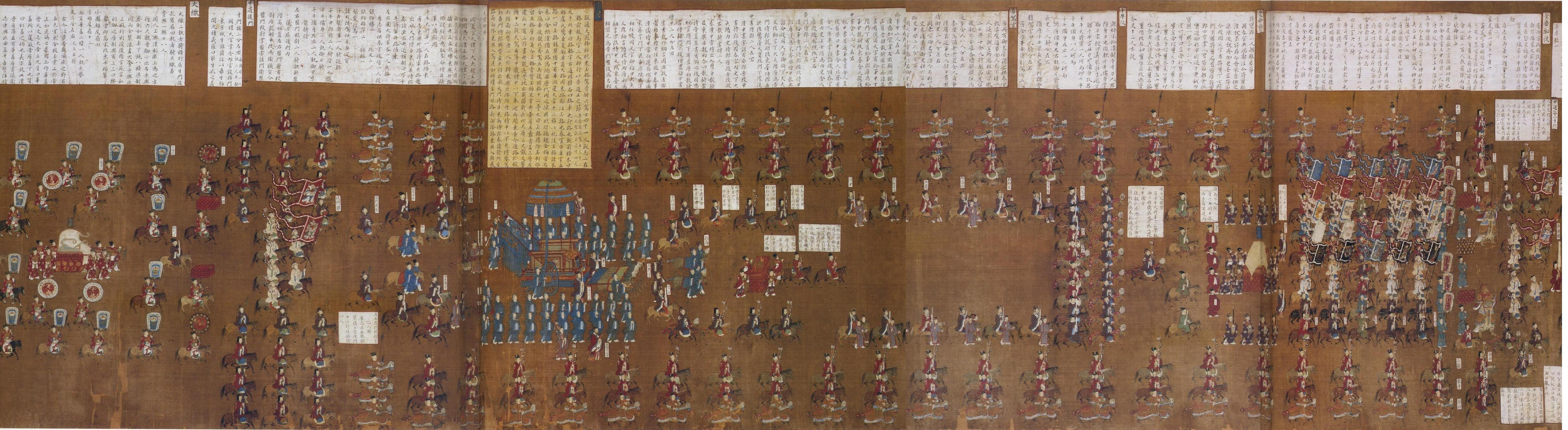
Section of Dajia lubu tushu (Imperial Chariot and Honor Guard), ca. 1053–1065, Song dynasty. Handscroll, 51.4 x 1481 cm

=== Yingzong (r. 1063–1067) ===
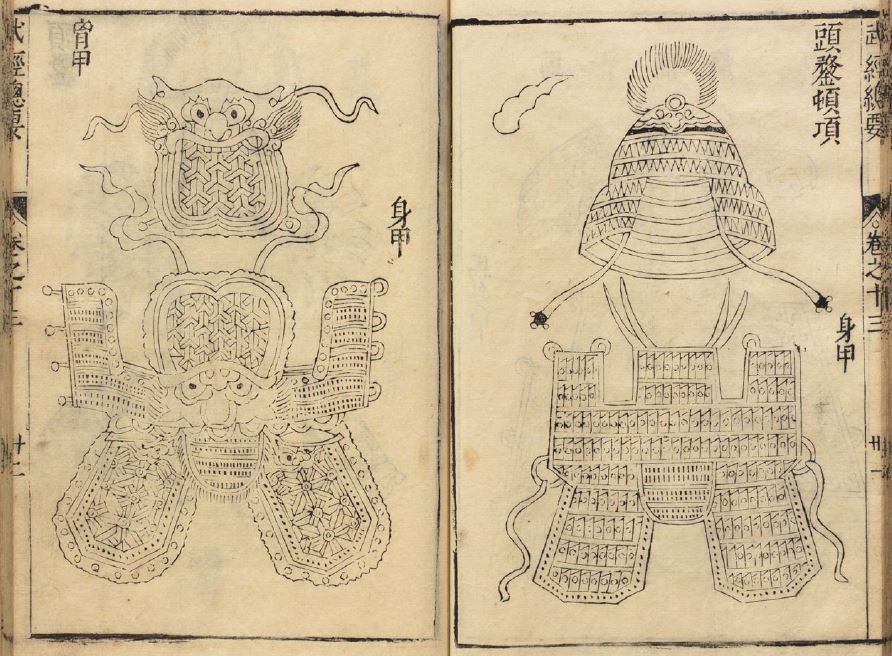
Officer's armour from the Wujing Zongyao

During Emperor Yingzong of Song's reign, the Western Xia raided Song territory in 1063 and 1066, but ultimately their emperor was wounded in action and died. Yingzong soon fell ill and died on 25 January 1067. He was succeeded by his son, Zhao Xu, posthumously Emperor Shenzong of Song.

=== Shenzong (r. 1067–1085) ===
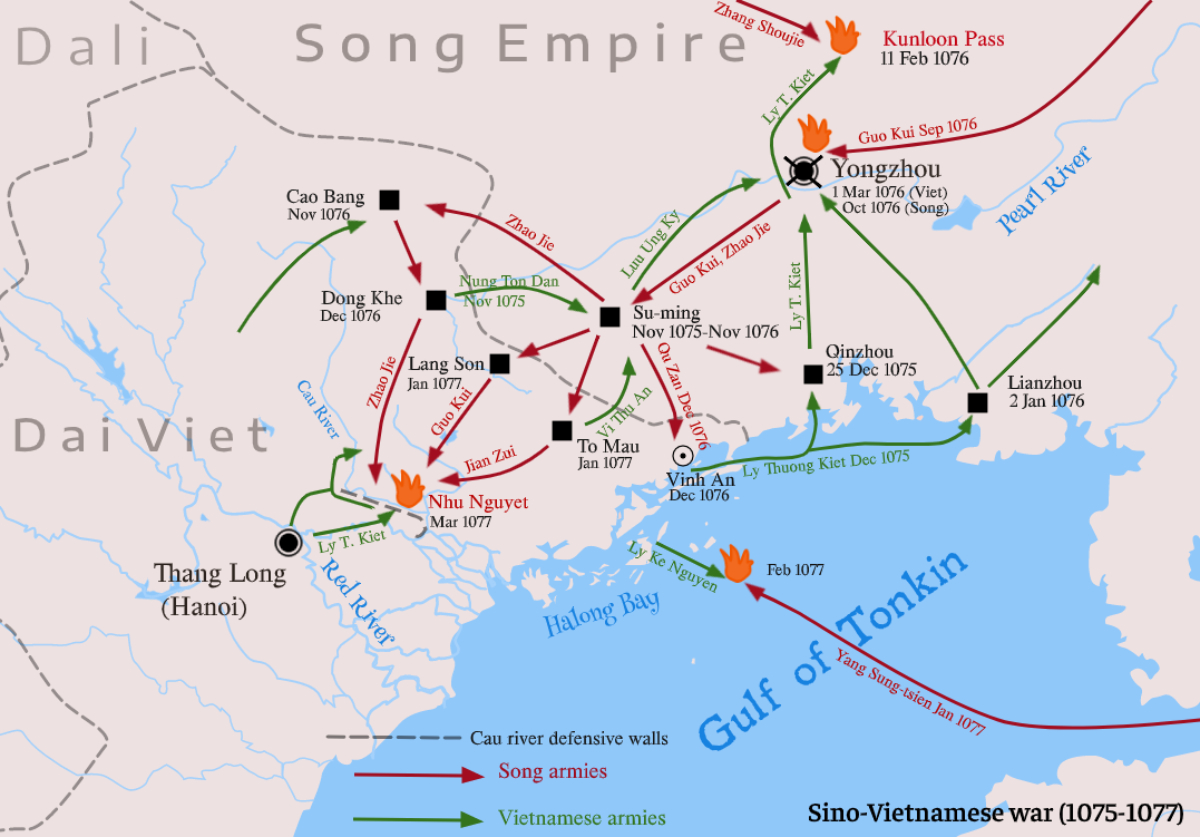
The Lý–Song War (1075–1077)

In 1067, private trade of gunpowder ingredients was banned by the Song.

In 1072 and 1073, the Song commander Wang Shao defeated the Tibetans of Tsongkha and conquered Xizhou and Hezhou.

Lý–Song War: In November 1075, Vietnamese generals Lý Thường Kiệt and Nùng Tông Đán invaded the Song dynasty with 63,000 troops, capturing Qinzhou, Lianzhou, and destroying Yongzhou before retreating. Emperor Shenzong proclaimed that “the [Vietnamese] king Lý Càn Đức has revolted and attacked my fortresses and towns.” Nine armies were dispatched to “end this tyrannical mode of government". The next year, Song general Guo Kui invaded Đại Việt and pushed to the Cầu River, where the war reached a stalemate.

In 1076, trade of gunpowder ingredients with the Liao and Western Xia dynasties was outlawed by the Song.

Lý–Song War: The war ended in 1077 with the Vietnamese Lý monarch agreed to becoming a Song tributary in return for the withdrawal of Song troops, despite inflicting heavy casualties on the Song Imperial army.

In 1081, Song forces invaded Western Xia but forgot to bring siege weapons, resulting in a prolonged siege that caused extreme supply problems. They were forced to retreat with heavy casualties.

In 1082, Western Xia conquered Yongle, a Song fort on their borders.

In 1083, 300,000 fire arrows were produced by the Song court and delivered to two garrisons.

Emperor Shenzong of Song died on 1 April 1085 and was succeeded by his son Zhao Xu, posthumously Emperor Zhezong of Song. Empress Gao became regent.

From the mid-Tang, when the provinces came to dominate [at the expense of the central government], down to the Five Dynasties, when numerous warlords contended for supremacy, the Nine Provinces between the Four Seas rotted like a carved up melon; armies swallowed each other up, while the common people wallowed in misery. This lasted over two hundred years. When Taizu received Heaven’s brilliant mandate, he sent out his armies against all those who would not submit, gloriously initiating the imperial way. Taizong succeeded him, bringing to fruition [Taizu’s] achievements, whereupon the Tracks of the Great Yu were all possessed by the Song. Subsequently, the weapons of war were put away, and the populace was granted a respite. People now can live to a very advanced age without witnessing warfare at any point in their lives. Administrators keep watch over the laws and standards, while the people are undisturbed in their occupations. Cocks crow, dogs bark, and smoke and flames [from the hearths] are in dense profusion. One might call this the ultimate in eras of peace; it is something that has rarely been matched since antiquity. When Shenzong inherited the throne [in 1068], the spirit [of his ministers] was heroic and martial. Because You, Ji, Yun, and Shuo [the Sixteen Prefectures] are in the hands of the Khitans; Lingwu and Hexi [in the northwest] are under the sole command of the [Tanguts]; and Cochin and Annam [in the far south] are controlled by the Ly family, it is no longer possible to establish bureaucrats there, nor to exact taxes or corvée labor. Compared to the territorial extent of the Han and the Tang, we are not yet whole. Fueled by the shame of this, there is now the fervent will to send out armies to open up [the frontier]. The result has been that military men on the frontier – who lie in wait for small gains, wantonly talking big and taking credit for the achievements of others without regard for the harm done to the state – vie to show off their bravado . . . And pasty-faced bookworms – steeped in texts and diagrams, who delight in ancient precedents without a sense of how to adapt them to contemporary circumstances – compete with each other to present bizarre policy proposals at court.

— Sima Guang on the outlook of Song irredentism

=== Zhezong (r. 1085–1100) ===
In 1098, the Western Xia retaliated against Song incursions but failed to defeat Song fortifications and sued for peace.

Emperor Zhezong of Song died on 23 February 1100 and was succeeded by his brother Zhao Ji, posthumously Emperor Huizong of Song.

=== Huizong (r. 1100–1126) ===
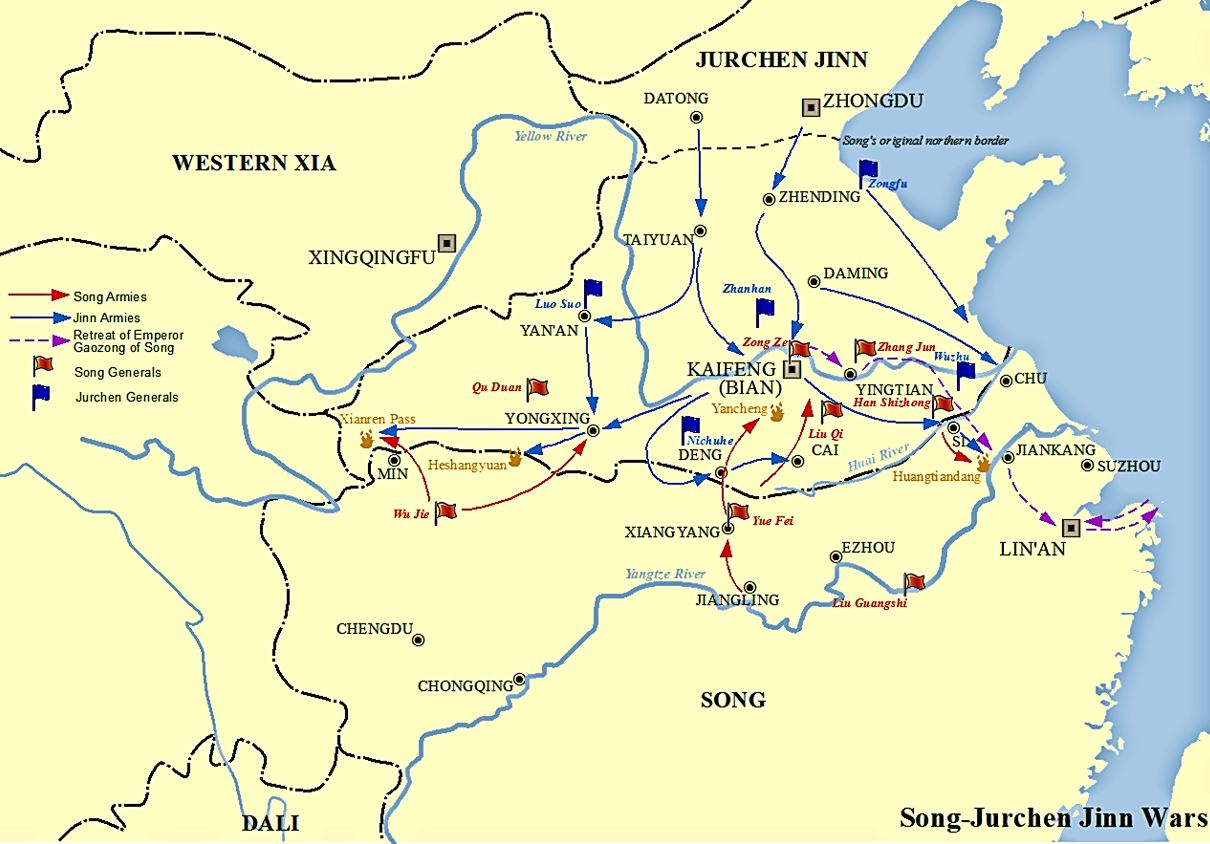
Jin–Song Wars

The Song dynasty invaded Western Xia in 1003 and the war lasted for two years before ending inconclusively.

In 1103, Hong Zhongfu reported that the Khitans and Tanguts were using the iron from Chinese coins to make their weapons. He proposed adding lead and tin to the coins to make the barbarian weapons brittle and unusable. The proposal was approved.

In 1104, the Song dynasty annexed Tsongkha, a Tibetan polity on their western borders.

In 1110, the Song army put on a firework display for the emperor including a spectacle which opened with "a noise like thunder" and explosives that light up the night. Considered by some to be the first mention of gunpowder fireworks.

The Song invaded Western Xia again in 1113. The war ended inconclusively in 1119.

In 1119, Song Jiang rebelled in Jingdong Circuit. He was suppressed in 1121.

In 1120, Fang La rebelled in Liangzhe Circuit and was suppressed.

In 1123, the Song invaded the Liao dynasty but was repelled. Zhang Jue rebelled in Pingzhou and defected to the Song but the Jin dynasty immediately retaliated and crushed his army. Zhang Jue was executed by the Song as reconciliation towards the Jin.

In November 1125, the Jin dynasty invaded the Song and occupied Shanxi and Hebei, beginning the first of the Jin–Song Wars.

On 18 January 1126, Emperor Huizong of Song abdicated to his son Zhao Huan, who succeeded him as Emperor Qinzong of Song.

=== Qinzong (r. 1126–1127) ===
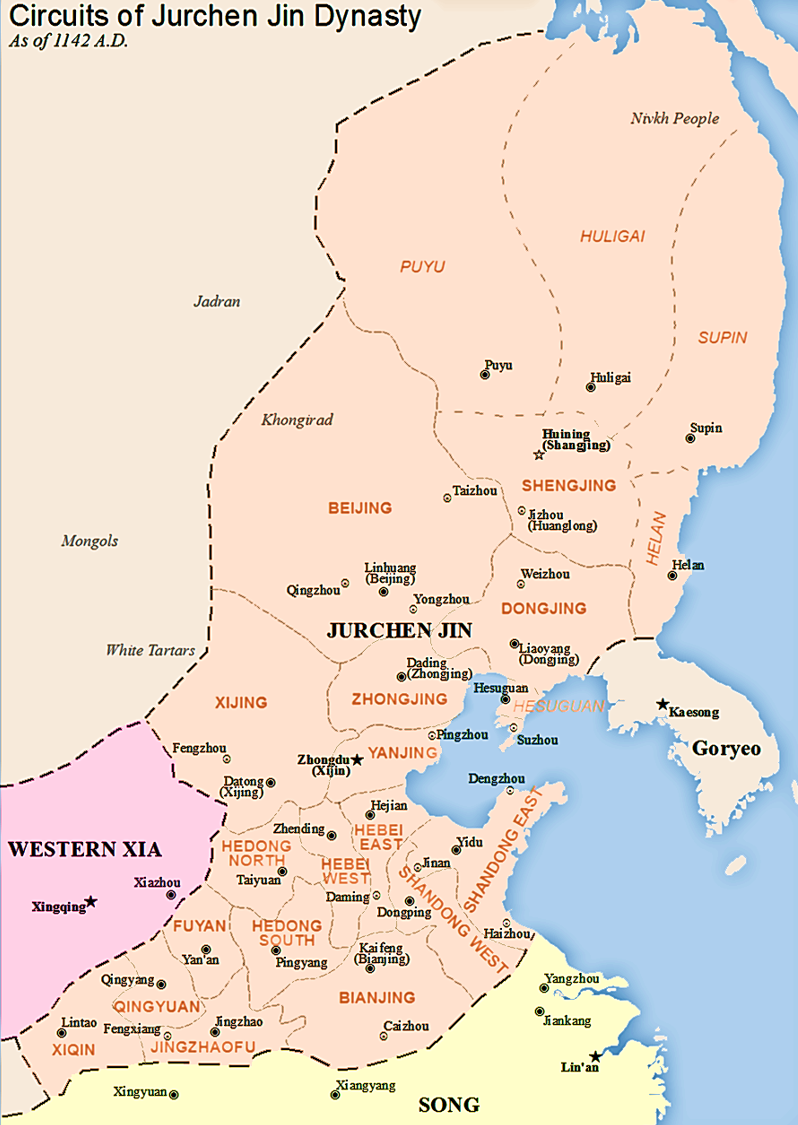
Jin dynasty in 1142

On 31 January 1126, the Jin dynasty laid siege to Kaifeng. Thunderclap bombs as well as fire arrows and fire bombs were used in the defense by Song troops. The Jin army retreated from Kaifeng after the Song promised to pay an annual indemnity. In June, the Jin defeated two Song armies. In December, the Jin returned with fire arrows and gunpowder bombs to lay siege to Kaifeng.

On 12 June 1127, Emperor Qinzong of Song's brother Zhao Gou was declared Emperor Gaozong of Song and the capital was moved to Lin'an.

Its name is almost that of the poetess Khansa, but I do not know whether it is Arabic or just coincides with Arabic. It is the biggest city I have seen on the face of the earth. It takes three days to cross it, the traveller journeying on and stopping [for the night] in the city. It is laid out as we have described in the Chinese style of building, everyone having his own orchard and house. It is divided into six cities which we shall describe.

— Ibn Battuta describing Lin'an (Hangzhou)

== Southern Song ==
=== Gaozong (r. 1127–1129, 1129–1162) ===
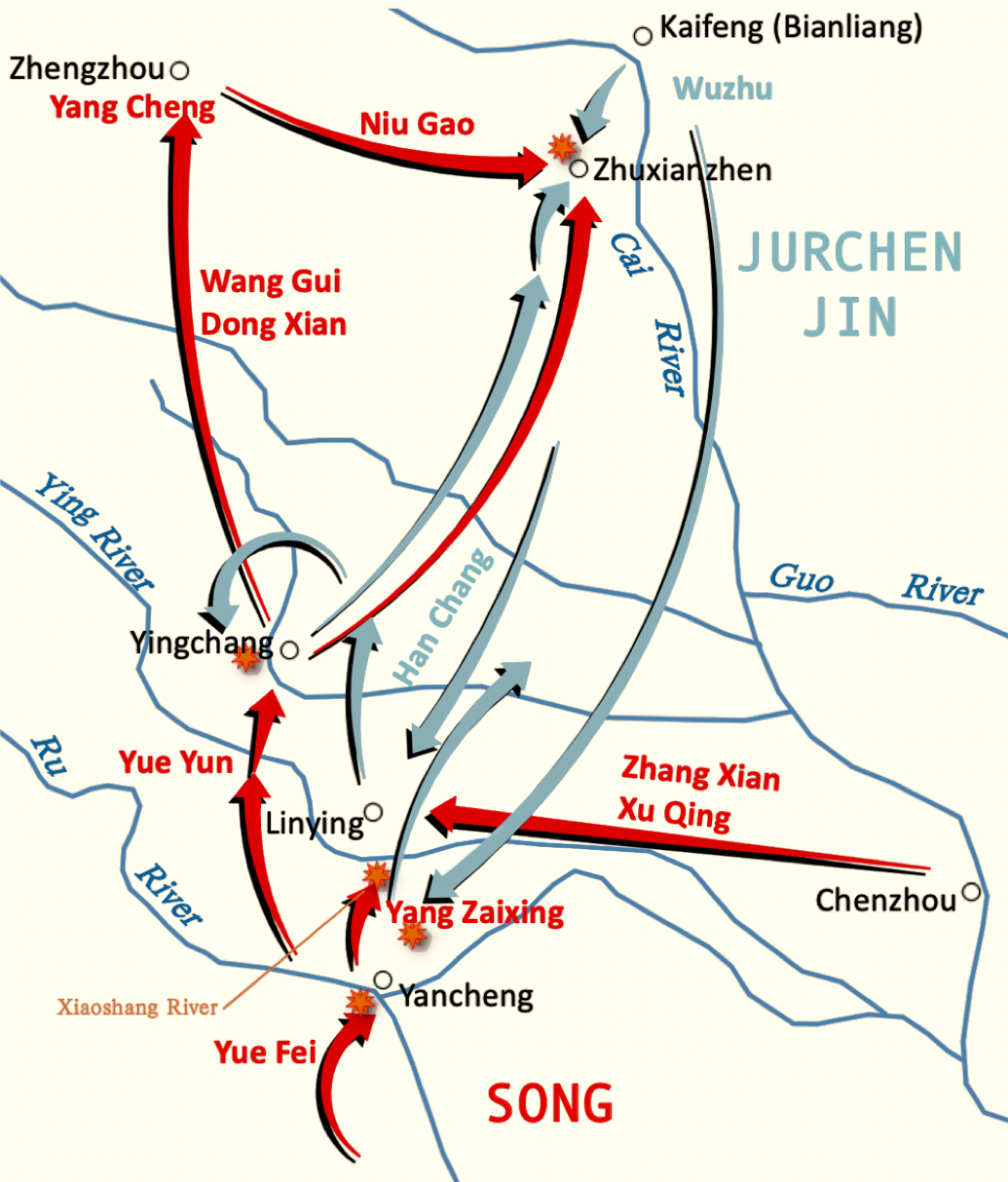
Battle of Yancheng between the Song dynasty and Jurchen Jin in 1140

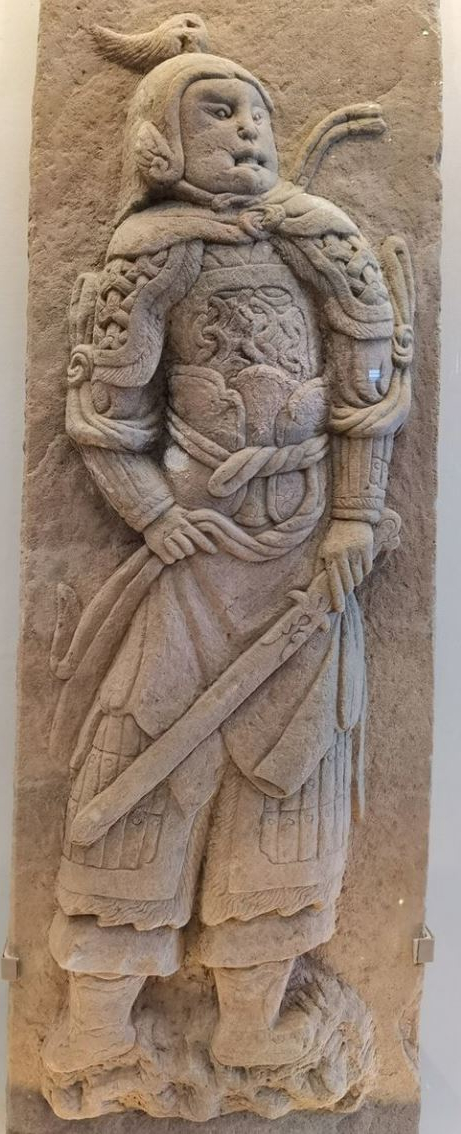
Song dynasty stone carving of a warrior in mountain pattern (shoulder) and mail armour (chest) wielding a sword

In December 1127, Kaifeng fell to the Jin dynasty and emperors Qinzong and Huizong were captured; territory north of the Huai River was annexed by the Jin. This would come to be known as the Jingkang Incident. This was the earliest recorded use of "molten metal bombs", suspected to contain gunpowder.

I asked him how it had come about that he had become so wealthy, and he said:
'I am one of the fortunate; perhaps I might tell you about it. When I was poor, and unable to support myself, I depended on charcoal and iron for a livelihood, and for many years there was no trouble. I forged [duanye] nothing but agricultural implements. Then came a series of calamitous years. The peasants, not being able to pay the interest on their loans, abandoned their fields and left to take up branch [non-agricultural] occupations. Cultivators became daily fewer. I made ploughshares, large hoes, weeding hoes, and hoes [li, yao, bo, chu], but though I expended a whole day's labour on a single implement, I might not sell it for a month and fifteen days; thus it was that I was so poor when I saw you last.
'But then there was military activity under Heaven, and [men with] dagger-axes and halberds filled the roads. Men wished to carry keen-edged [weapons], and families wished to store up sharp-pointed [weapons]. Those who wished to protect themselves with knives, swords, crossbow-bolts, and arrowheads [dao, jian, zu, di] daily filled my courtyard.
'Day and night I "served the furnace and hammer" without rest. Within a half year I had this house, and after a year I had a great abundance of the means of life. Today I wear both fur and silk; I live comfortably, fill my belly, and have no more anxieties - such is my good fortune.'
After hearing his story I left and said, ill at ease, 'Alas! The smith's good fortune IS the misfortune of the common people!

— Fan Jun meeting a blacksmith's family in the aftermath of the Jingkang Incident, 1127

The earliest extant depiction of a cannon appeared among the Dazu Rock Carvings, completed in 1128, one of which is a human figure holding a gourd shaped hand cannon. This is disputed by others who believe the carving depicts a figure letting air out of a bag.

In 1129, Song warships were outfitted with trebuchets and supplies of gunpowder bombs.

In 1130, Jin forces were ambushed at the Battle of Huangtiandang and forced to stop at the Yangtze for some time before making the crossing. Zhong Xiang rebelled in Hunan and was not suppressed until 1135.

The sky was clear, there was no wind, and the heat of the sun was strong. The large sea-going ships [of the Chinese] were unable to move. The men of Jin shot incendiary arrows at the mat-sails [of the Chinese ships] which were set on fire. [Han] Shizhong had originally prepared his ships for fighting on the water and on land. His troops were in complete armor and the horses wore iron face-masks and leather armor. The ships carrying men and horses, food and supplies, were unable to move without wind. When the flames arose, the men shouted in confusion and the horses neighed in fright.

— Zhao Shengji describing the failure of Song forces to prevent the Jin crossing

In 1131, Jin forces invaded Shaanxi but were repelled, in particular by a volley fire tactic implemented by general Wu Jie (吳 玠) and his younger brother Wu Lin (吳璘). Li Cheng rebelled in Huainan and was suppressed. The Song established China's first standing navy.

In 1132, Jin forces laid siege to De'an. In the Siege of De'an, fire lances were used by Song troops to repel the invaders. In the same year, gunpowder was referred to specifically for its military applications for the first time: "fire bomb medicine" rather than "fire medicine". Firecrackers using gunpowder were mentioned for the first time.

In 1133, the Jin puppet state of Qi invaded the Song but was repelled by Yue Fei.

In 1135, Qi captured Xiangyang, but Yue Fei retaliated and recaptured the lost territory.

In 1136, Qi invaded Song territory again but was repelled.

In 1140, the Jin invaded the Song and were repelled by Yue Fei at the Battle of Yancheng. However Yue Fei was ordered to retreat by Emperor Gaozong of Song in fear of further conflict with the Jin. Yue Fei was arrested and executed on 27 January 1142.

In October 1142, the Song and Jin agreed to the Treaty of Shaoxing which stipulated that the Song must pay Jin an annual indemnity; the Huai River was settled as the boundary between the two states.

On 28 October 1161, the Jin invaded the Song again. The forces led by Wanyan Liang easily defeated the Song forces and closed in on the Changjiang. However, using new fire arrows and thunderclap bombs, the Song dealt devastating losses to the Jin fleet at the Battle of Tangdao on 16 November and the Battle of Caishi on 27 November.

The ships built by the men of Jin are constructed according to the instructions given them by some Fujian men. The northerners say they are Ni Manzi 倪蠻子 “Little Barbarian,’’ [a derogatory term used by border peoples of the North in referring to Southern Chinese] and two others. The seven hundred ships built are in the Tongzhou manner. These men have been given the rank of expectant Zhongyi Jiaowei 忠翊校尉. The Tatar chief told them that when success is achieved, they will be made provincial governors.
Their [naval] commanders are all [former] officers of the south Song, such as Jin Sai 靳賽, Xu Wen, Meng Bin 孟彬, and Wang Dadao 王大刀 (Big Sword Wang). The sailors they drafted are all gardeners, rice farmers and fishermen who are unacquainted with the nature of water in rivers and the sea. Their officials often accept bribes, and it has been said that the men who actually know how to handle boats were exempted when they have money [to pay bribes], and those who know nothing about seamanship were drafted when they had nothing to pay as bribes. The men of Suzhou 宿州 (in northern Anhui) who were drafted as sailors, found no place where they could make their complaints, and in desperation they assaulted and killed the magistrate and his servants, before they left. From this one may see how the peoples’ heart has been coerced.

— A report on the state of the Jin navy to the Song court submitted on 14 August 1161

On 24 July 1162, Gaozong abdicated to his adopted son Zhao Bocong, posthumously Emperor Xiaozong of Song. Wanlan Liang ambushed the forces of Wu Lin while they were retreating and defeated them.

=== Xiaozong (r. 1162–1189) ===
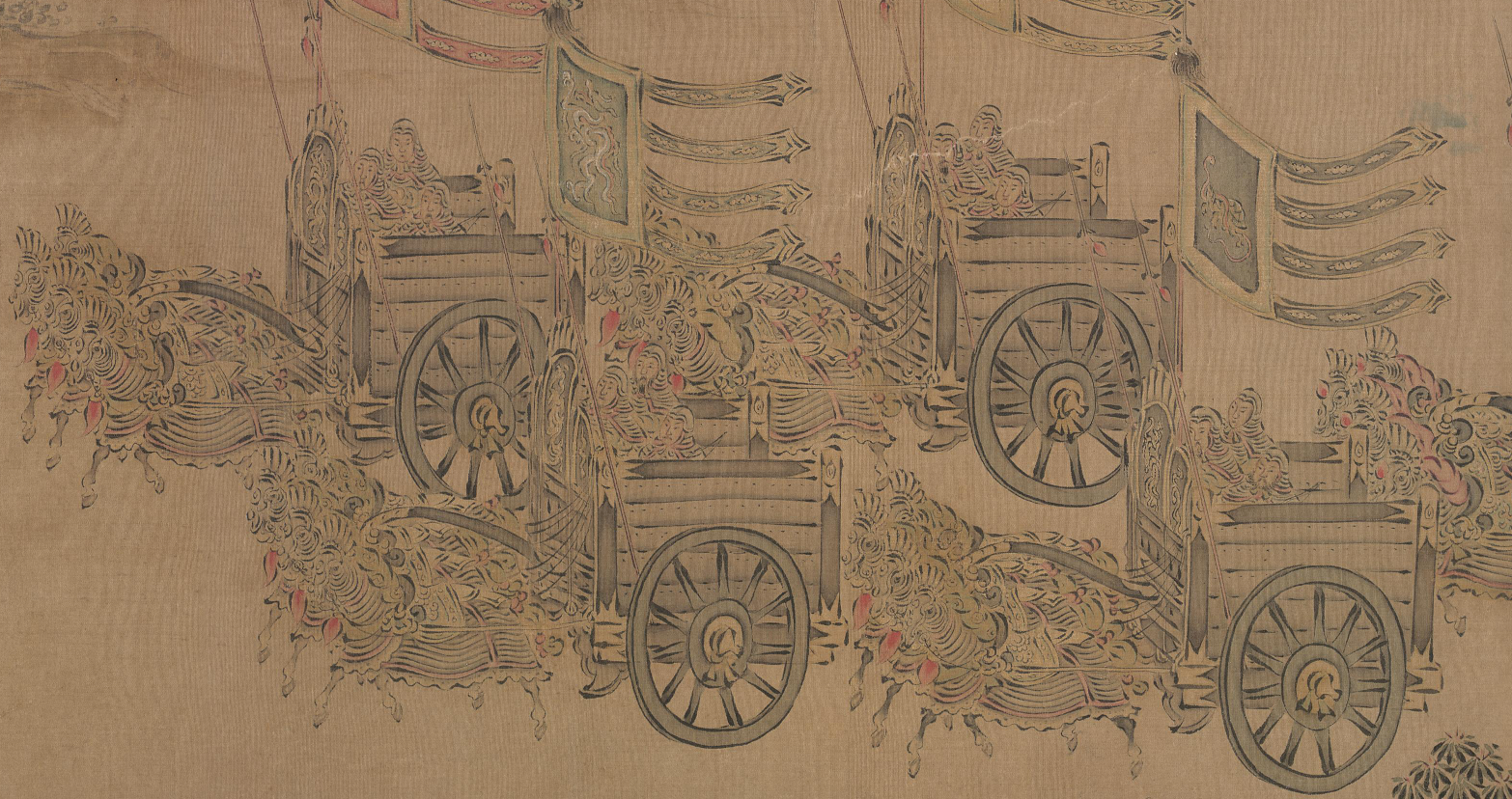
Armored horses pulling chariots in Lu Ming Zhi Shi Tu by Ma Hezhi (ca. 1130-1170)

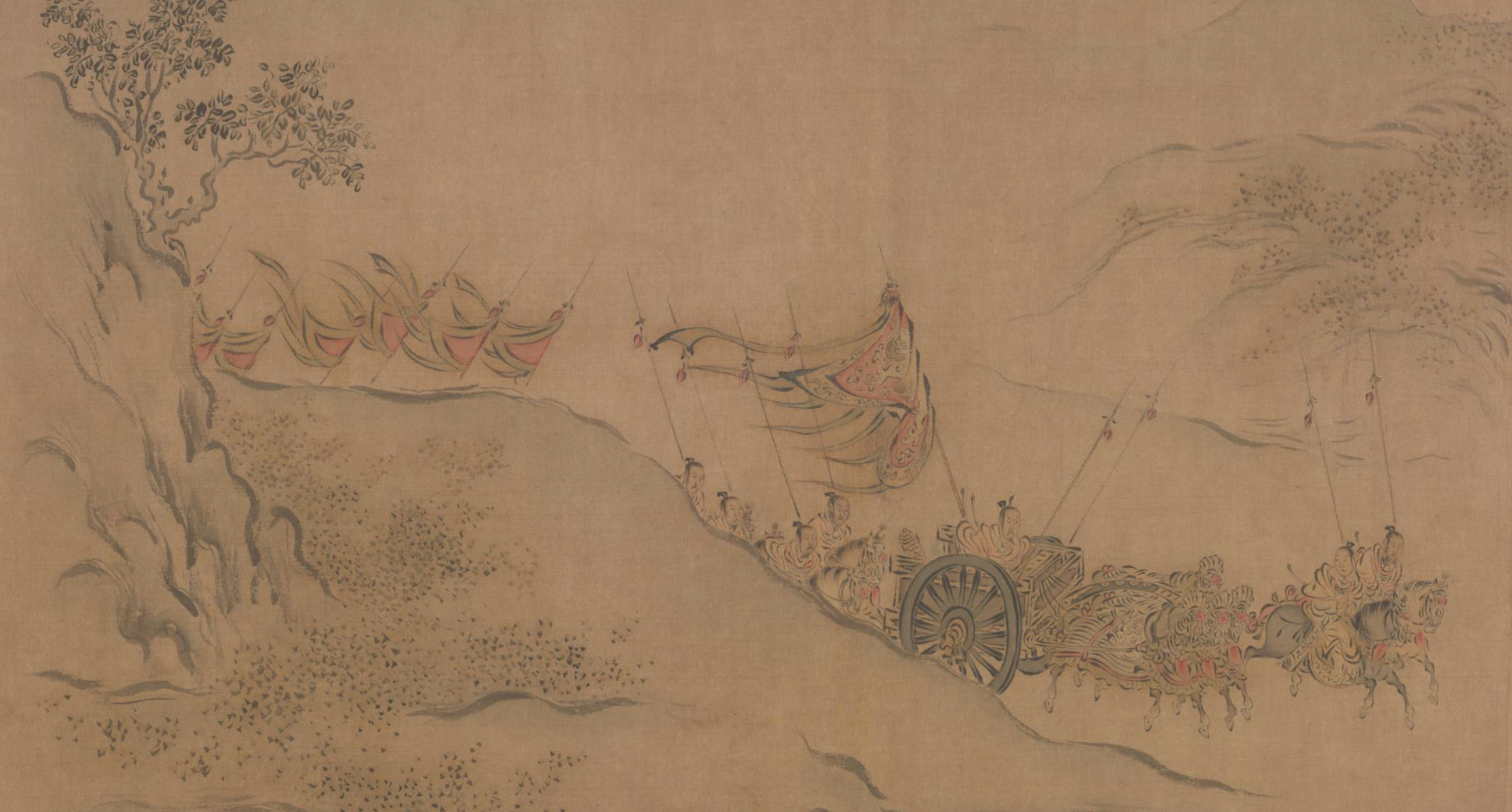
Armored horses pulling a chariot in Lu Ming Zhi Shi Tu by Ma Hezhi (ca. 1130-1170)

In the summer of 1163, Zhang Jun attacked the Jin using fire lance carts, but suffered defeat.

In 1165, the Song and Jin agreed to peace and a return to status quo.

At the lower end of the courtyard 50 guards with brocade robes and golden hats were lined up. Musicians stood to their left. There were in addition one guard who grasped the bow and arrow for the banquet manager, two men who shot the crossbow for the hostel attendant, and one man who sighted the target. Two men stood at the side of the target to shout out the shot. Each time the target was hit, they faced the banquet hall and bent over, waving their hands and reporting to the musicians, who shouted out and struck [their drums] to make it known. Then they played music. If the target was not hit, then they raised and lowered their hands in back so the results would be known. At the first hit, they looked at the ruler and paid their respects. The guards took the first arrow [that hit the target] and struck it in the middle of a silver plate. They passed it to the front, then went and sat down and drank together. The victor pledged with wine all around. After this, they again shot . . . After the envoy and deputy paid their respects, they desired to end the ritual; but the military escorts wanted to remain, and so they could not rest. They repeatedly said they would be grateful to stop, and finally it ended. The crossbowers in the two halls each toasted their efforts with the two plates [from shooting]. They changed [back into their original] clothing and went to their seats, had two more rounds of wine, and then it was over.

— A Song dynasty envoy describing an archery contest during an embassy to Jin in the winter of 1169-1170

In 1170, the Song occupied the Penghu Islands.

On 18 February 1189, Emperor Xiaozong of Song abdicated to his son Zhao Dun, posthumously Emperor Guangzong of Song. |}

=== Guangzong (r. 1189–1194) ===
Emperor Guangzong of Song was an awful ruler and was forced to abdicate on 24 July 1194 to his son Zhao Kuo, posthumously Emperor Ningzong of Song.

=== Ningzong (r. 1194–1224) ===
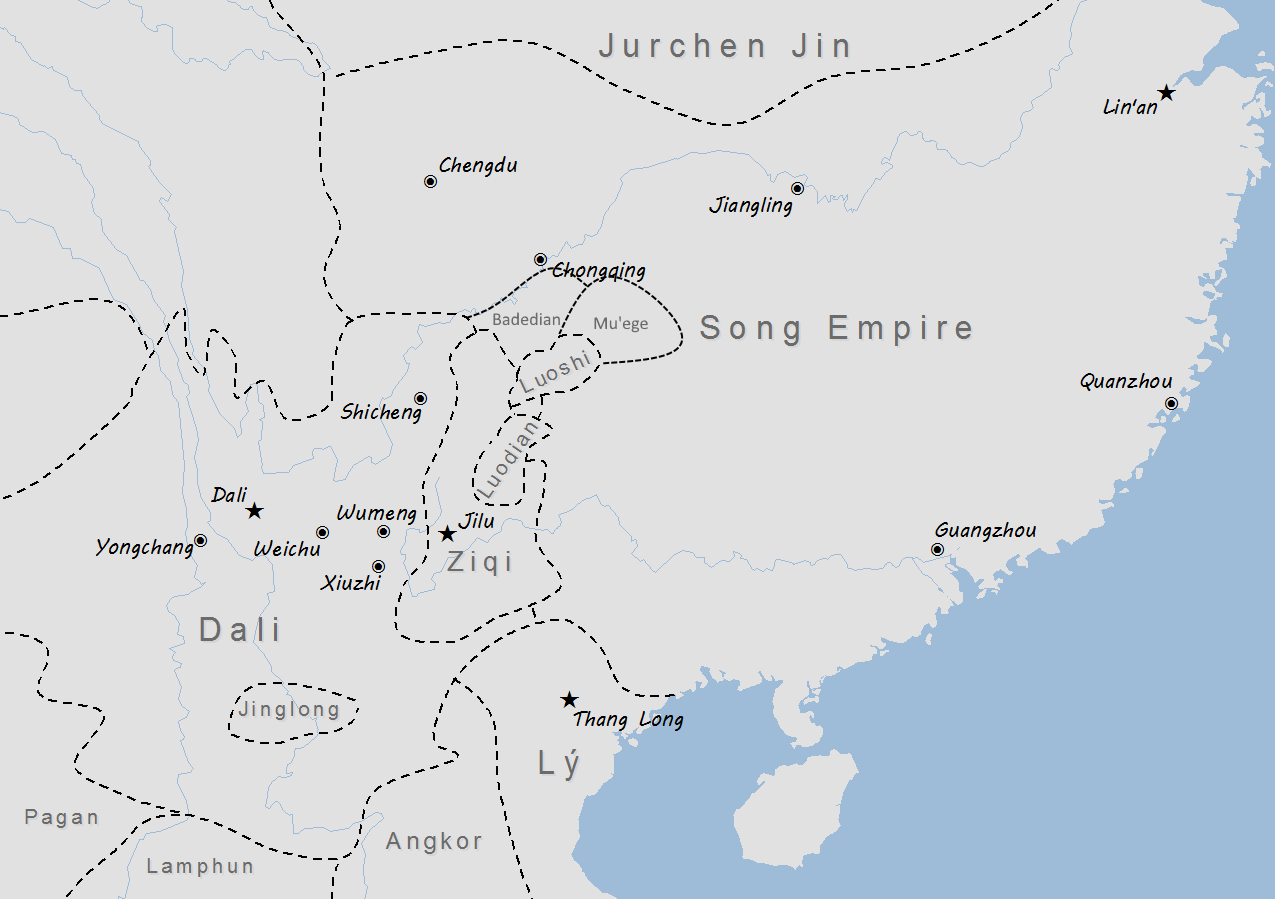
Southern Song in 1200

In 1195, rebellion broke out in Sichuan.

In 1204, Song forces began displaying military aggression on the Jin border.

In June 1206, the Song declared war on the Jin. In December, the governor-general of Sichuan, Wu Xi, defected to the Jin, but he was killed on 29 March 1207 by loyalists. Thunderclap bombs were employed by Song forces in a sneak attack on a Jin camp, killing 2,000 men and 800 horses. The war entered a stalemate in April 1207 and on 2 November 1208, the two sides agreed to restore the former status quo with the Song returning to tributary status.

In 1208, a rebellion by the Yao people occurred in Jinghu and was suppressed. A rebellion in Sichuan also occurred.

In 1210, a rebellion occurred in Jinghu and was suppressed.

In 1211, a rebellion occurred in Sichuan.

In 1214, Jin forces raided Song territory.

In the spring of 1217, the Jin dynasty invaded the Song but was repelled. A rebellion broke out in Sichuan.

In 1219, the Jin invaded the Song and was repelled. A rebellion broke out in Sichuan and was suppressed.

In 1220, a rebellion occurred in Sichuan.

In 1221, the Jin dynasty invaded the Song. They brought with them iron casing bombs which were employed in the siege of Qi Prefecture (Hubei). They were ultimately repelled.

On 17 September 1224, Ningzong died and was succeeded by his adopted son Zhao Yun, posthumously Emperor Lizong of Song. The Song and Jin made peace in the same year.

=== Lizong (r. 1224–1264) ===
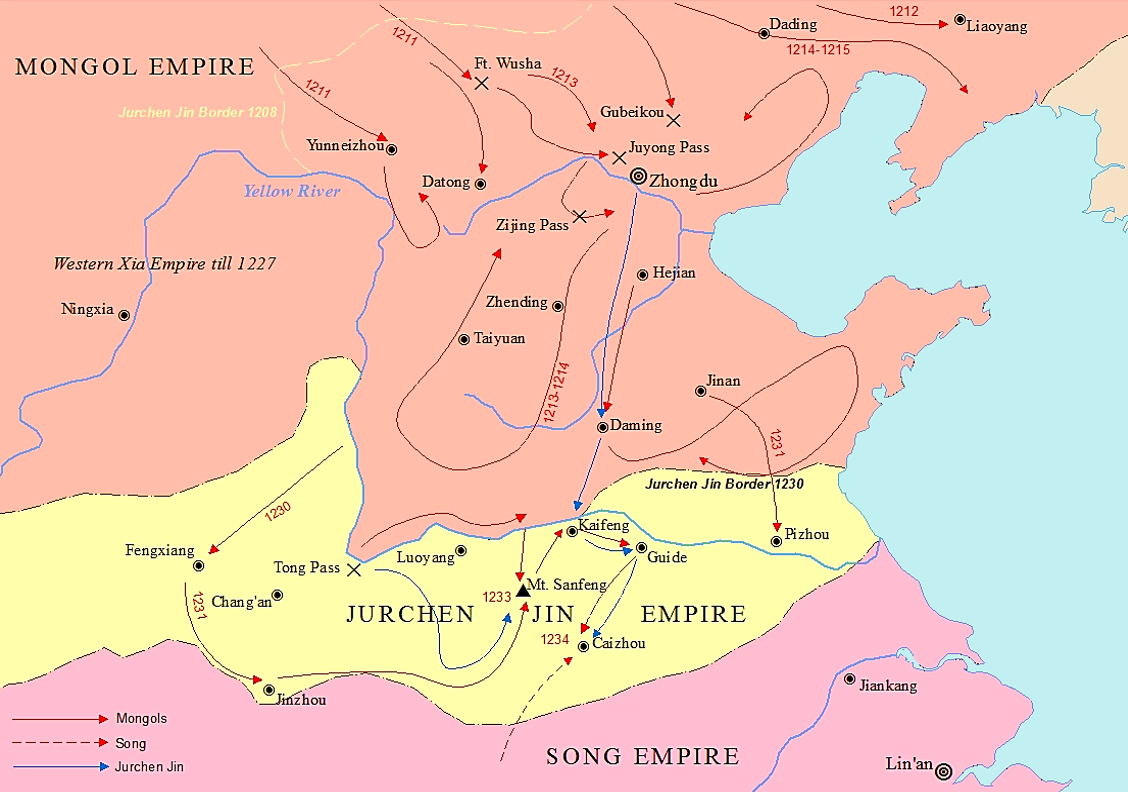
Mongol conquest of the Jin dynasty

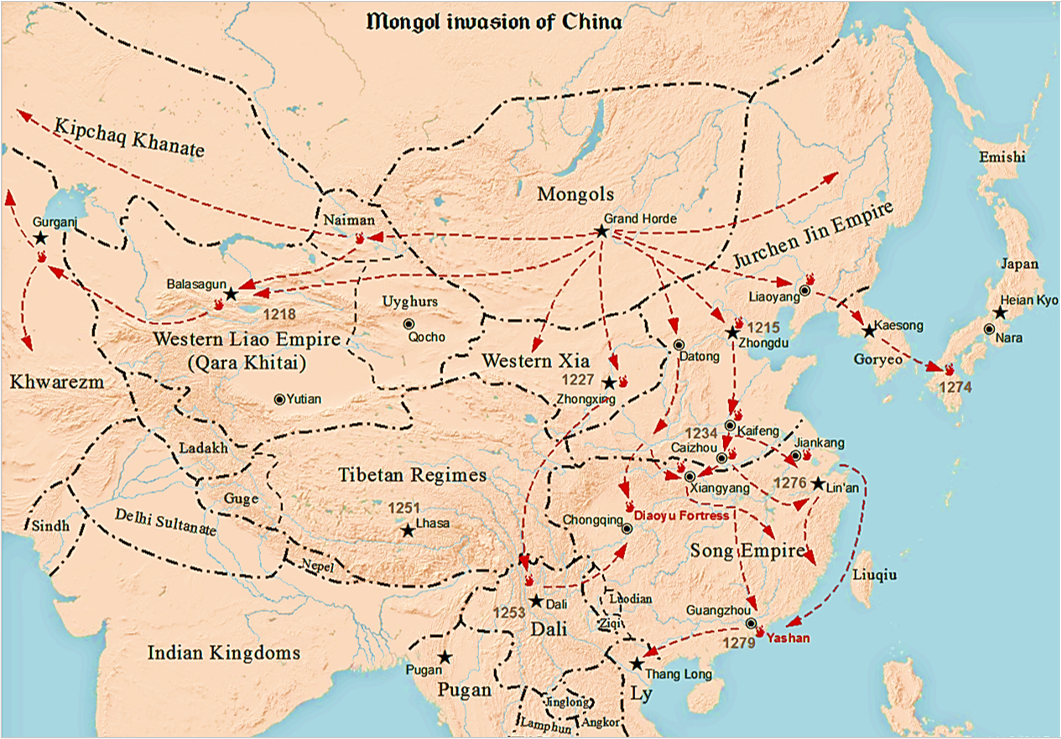
Mongol conquest of China

In 1230, co-viative projectiles were added to fire lances.

In 1231, Song patrols killed a Mongol envoy. In retaliation the Mongols raided Sichuan.

In the summer of 1233, the Song army took advantage of the Mongol invasion of the Jin dynasty, and attacked the Jin as well.

In 1234, a Song army was annihilated by the Mongols at Luoyang.

In 1235, Mongols raided Song territory.

In 1236, Mongols routed Song forces in Sichuan.

In 1237, Mongols employed large bombs requiring several hundred men to hurl using trebuchets in the siege of Anfeng (modern Shouxian, Anhui Province).

In 1238, counterattacks by Song forces forced the Mongols to withdraw.

As to the naval forces, there are [for example] the five thousand men at Jinjiang. Last autumn when this official inspected them, he found that about five hundred men are strong and fit for battle. The rest of the men are weary, dispirited, deaf, moronic, slender, short and weak.
Look at them and one can see what the men [in other naval units] are like. They cannot ride the waves and thrust with their spears. This is the result of thirty years of neglect [of the navy]. They cannot be used for war and yet they cannot be retired. They can only be used to pitch tents and to carry flags in camps in South China.
Then there is the naval force at Xupu which has 11,500 men on its roster. But 2025 men were sent to Huaidong 淮東, 1000 men to Xiazhou 峡州 [in Sichuan], 500 men to Youzhou, 1000 men to Jinling [Nanjing], 2099 men employed in transporting grain in Huaixi 淮西, and over 1000 other men detached for other duties, leaving only 2540 men at the naval base. Of this number, a third are weak and sickly.
Of the combined forces at Ganpu and Jinshan, there are only 2600 men left in the naval bases, and a third of them are weak and sickly.

— Wu Qian's assessment of the Song navy in a report dated 1239

In 1242 and 1243, Mongols raided Sichuan.

In 1244, Mongols raided Huainan.

In 1245, Mongols occupied Shouzhou. Rockets were used during a military exercise conducted by the Song navy.

In 1246, Mongols raided Huainan.

In 1252, Mongol forces under the Chinese general Wang Dechen advanced into Sichuan and occupied Lizhou.

In the summer of 1256, Möngke Khan declared war on the Song, citing imprisonment of Mongol envoys as casus belli.

In 1257, 333 "fire emitting tubes" were produced in a Song arsenal in Jiankangzhou (Nanjing, Jiangsu).

In 1258, Mongol forces captured Chengdu.

In January 1259, Mongol forces captured Yazhou. Möngke Khan laid siege to Diaoyu Castle from February to July and retreated. He died on 12 August from a wound inflicted by a Song trebuchet, forcing Mongol forces to withdraw from Song territory. According to the History of Song, in 1259, a "fire-emitting lance" employed a pellet wad projectile which occluded the barrel. Some consider this to be the first bullet.

In 1260, a gunpowder arsenal caught fire while the gunpowder was being dried. The four tigers that were being raised next to the arsenal by the prime minister Zhao Nanzhong died in the explosion.

On 22 February 1262, Mongol-allied warlord of Shandong, Li Tan, defected to the Song dynasty In August, Kublai Khan's Chinese generals Shi Tianze and Shi Chu crushed Li Tan's forces and captured him; Li Tan was trampled to death by horses

In 1264, Emperor Lizong of Song died and was succeeded by his nephew Zhao Qi, posthumously Emperor Duzong of Song.

=== Duzong (r. 1264–1274) ===
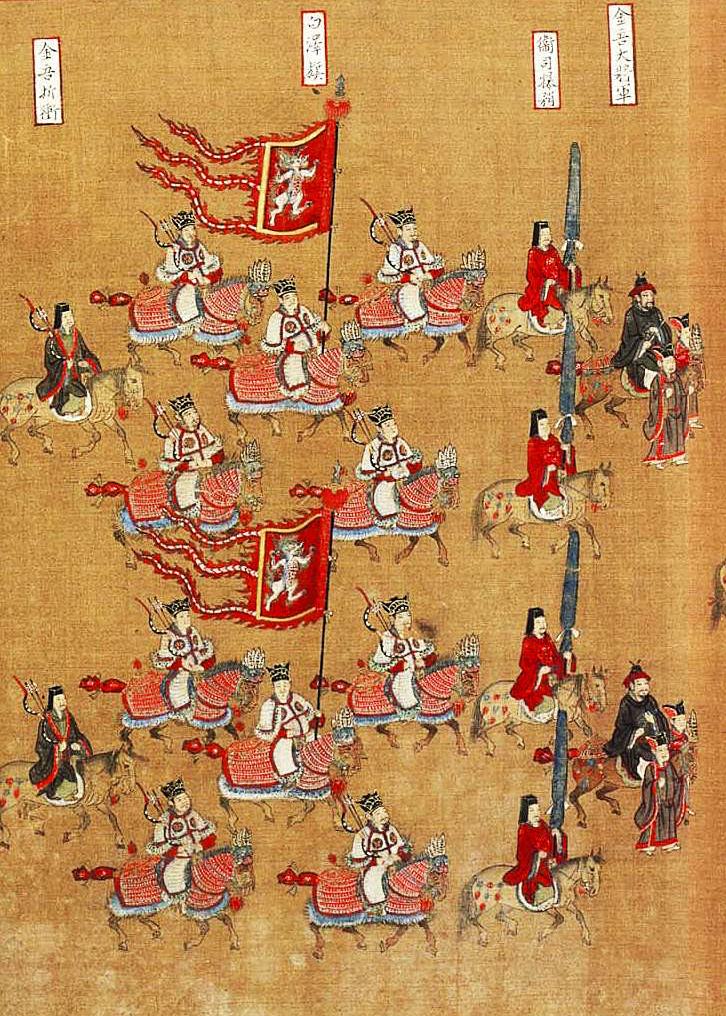
Song dynasty cavalry

In 1265, Song and Mongol forces clashed in Sichuan.

In 1268, Aju of the Mongols laid siege to Xiangyang.

In 1271, Kublai Khan declared himself emperor of the Yuan dynasty.

In 1272, riverine relief forces used fire lances to repel boarders and broke the Mongol blockade of Xiangyang.

In March 1273, Lü Wenhuan surrendered Xiangyang to Yuan.

On 12 August 1274, Emperor Duzong of Song died and was succeeded by his son Zhao Xian, posthumously Emperor Gong of Song; Xie Daoqing became regent.

=== Gong (r. 1274–1276) ===
In January 1275, Bayan's forces crossed the Yangtze at Hankou and in March met Jia Sidao in battle at Dingjiaozhou, annihilating his force using artillery equipment, conquering the Hanshui region.

On the 18th day (16 March), [We]advanced to battle. Bayan said, “They outnumber us. We have to use strategy to win.” He ordered the troops to build scores of large rafts on which firewood and combustibles were piled, saying that he intended to set fire to the enemy boats. The men of Song watched for a day and a night until their vigilance relaxed. Bayan ordered his men to advance along the banks of the river and to signal [when they were in position]. The warships would then make a combined assault on the Song fleet.
Aju met the [Song] vanguard under Sun Huchen, imperial commissioner (Guancha Shi 觀察使) of Taizhou. [Behind Sun] the main [Song] fleet of 2500 ships was stretched out on the river. It was under the command of Xia Gui. [Jia] Sidao commanded the rear.
By this time, our forces under several commanders had moved forward along the banks of the river and had set up pao (artillery) to pound the center [of the Song fleet]. The southern fleet was shaken. Bayan then ordered our ships to press forward. Aju, holding the tiller, dashed his ship against the enemy. The roll of drums was like thunder shaking heaven and earth. As our ships neared the enemy, [our men] shouted, “Song is defeated.” [Jia] Sidao became terrified and the ships [under his command] lost formation, suddenly scattering and suddenly bunching together.
Using a small flag, Aju signalled his officers in fast light boats to attack the [enemy] flanks. They penetrated deep [into the enemy formation]. The Song forces, shattered, turned around to flee. Bayan sent infantry and cavalry to pursue them for over 150 li.

— Yuan Jingshi Dadian

On 22 March 1276, Lin'an surrendered to the Mongols and Emperor Gong of Song was eventually moved to Dunhuang where he raised a family and became a monk. On 14 June, loyalists enthroned Zhao Shi, the former emperor's brother, posthumously known as Emperor Duanzong of Song.

=== Duanzong (r. 1276–1278) ===
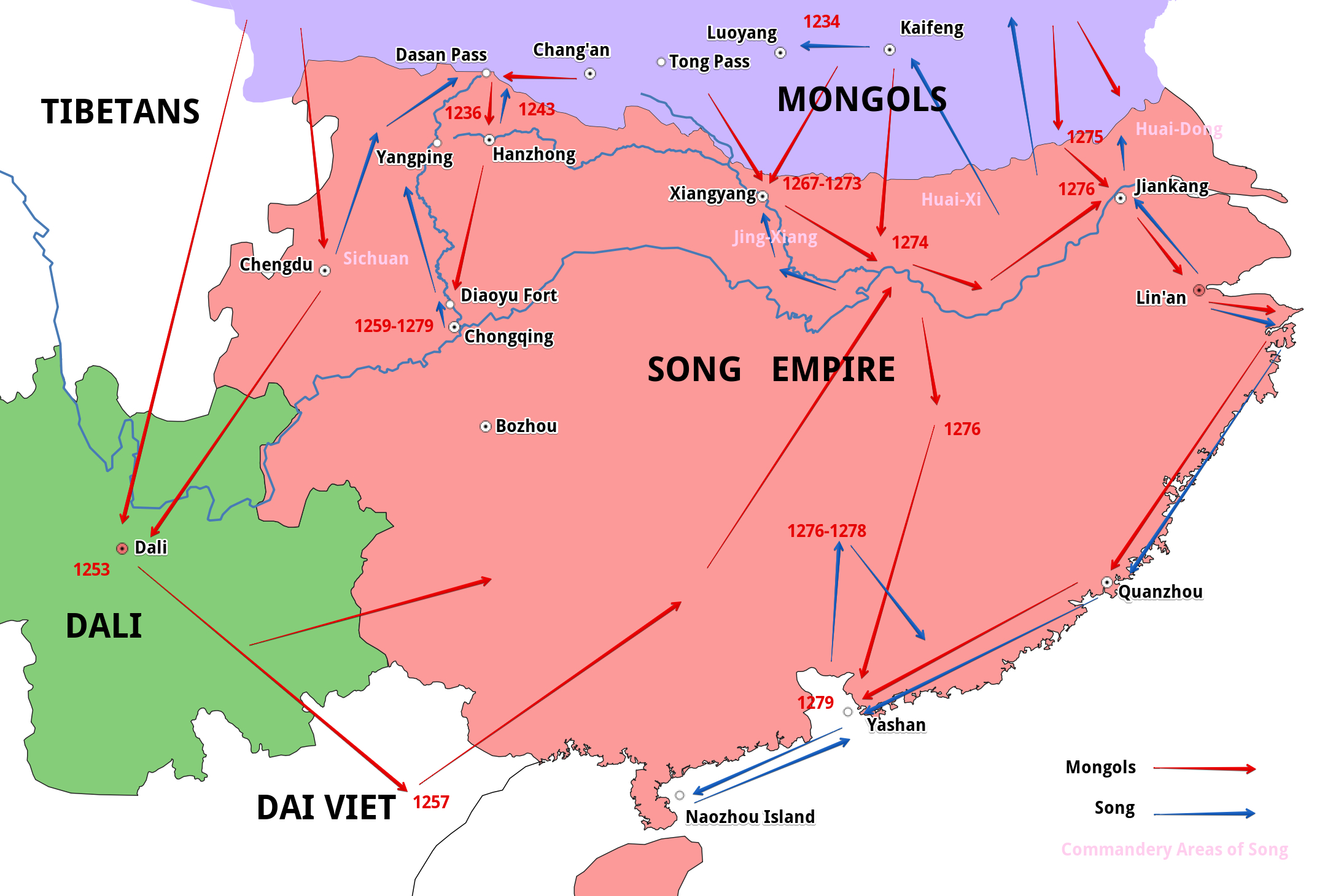
Mongol invasion of the Song dynasty (1234–79)

In 1276, Mongol forces defeated a Song army near modern Guichi District. Arigh Kaya conquered Hunan and Guangxi while Sodu occupied Fuzhou. At this point, reusable fire lance barrels made of metal were employed by the Song army.

In April 1277, the Muslim superintendent of Quanzhou, Pu Shougeng, defected to Yuan. He defected after Song general Zhang Shijie seized his ships and properties after Pu refused to lend Zhang ships for the war.

When we had crossed the sea the first city to which we came was Zaitun. There are no olives in it, or in the whole of China and India, but it has been given this name. It is a huge and important city in which are manufactured the fabrics of velvet, damask and satin which are known by its name and which are superior to those of Khansa and Khan Baliq. Its harbour is among the biggest in the world, or rather is the biggest; I have seen about a hundred big junks there and innumerable little ones. It is a great gulf of the sea which runs inland till it mingles with the great river. In this city, as in all cities in China, men have orchards and fields and their houses are in the middle, as they are in Sijilmasa in our country. This is why their towns are so big.

— Ibn Battuta describing Quanzhou (Zaitun)

In 1278, Sodu occupied Guangzhou.

On 9 May 1278, Duanzong died in Guangnan and was succeeded by his brother Zhao Bing.

=== Zhao Bing (r. 1278–1279) ===
Song shieldbearers

On 19 March 1279, the Mongol fleet annihilated the Song fleet at the Battle of Yamen. Zhao Bing died at sea; so ended the Song dynasty.

Suddenly, the sky over the west end of the island became overcast and there was a light drizzle in the air. [Zhang] Hongfan said: “This is an auspicious omen.” The tide ebbed and the water drained to the south. [Li] Heng in the north sailed down with the flow of the current dashing onto and breaking into the enemy formation. Then he signaled his ships to follow him as his helmsman pushed hard at the tiller to put his ship about. When we hit their palisade, our men [climbed up on it and] from above looked down on the enemy, their courage increased a hundredfold. They sprang down onto the [enemy] ships, cut the hawsers and fought with their swords (literally: short weapons 短兵 duanbing). The enemy troops were veterans from the [Yangzi] River and the Huai [River] and they fought with courage and resolution. Arrows and rocks filled the sky. By the hour of si (9‒11 a.m.) [we] had captured three ships. [Li] Heng then directed his batur (elite) troops to fight their fast ships.
By the hour of wu (11 a.m.‒l p.m.), the tide ebbed [mistake for rose?] and the current flowed northward. Our southern division moved up with the current to attack. [Zhang] Shijie found himself assailed from the front and the rear. He fired huopao [incendiary bombs] at the southern division, setting fire to and sinking one ship. The pao [were soon] used up and [there was not enough powder] to ignite even a foot [of fuse].
But the [tide of] battle was turning to be unfavorable [to the Yuan attackers]. [Zhang] Hongfan had to send in more troops before he succeeded in capturing a ship. From [the deck of Zhang Hongfan’s ship], enclosed by cloth screens and shields there came the sound of music. The enemy thought that it was meal time and they relaxed [their vigilance]. [Zhang] Hongfan sailed his ship close to the enemy exposing it to danger. Then he turned his ship around so that its stern touched [the ship of] Zuo Da. Zuo Da [’s men] shot arrows so that the cloth screen and the riggings [of Zhang Hongfan’s ship] bristled like a hedgehog. When [Zhang] Hongfan felt that Zuo Da had used up his supply of arrows, he ordered the screen and the shields removed. His men shot a stream of fire and rocks, and thus captured Zuo Da’s ship. Then [Zhang] Hongfan pushed forward to engage [the Song] Imperial Censor Xia, capturing seven ships. The enemy became disheartened and demoralized. [Many] jumped into the sea. The other [Song] officers joined forces and fought desperately in the melee. The battle lasted from si (9‒11 a.m.) to shen (3‒5 p.m.) and the noise reverberated in the sky and on the sea. [We] killed or captured almost their entire [force].

— Yuan account of the Battle of Yamen

== Organization ==
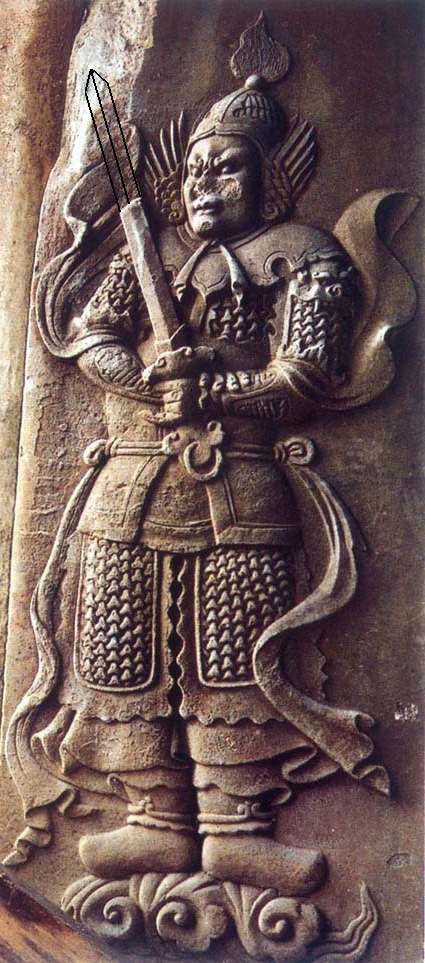
Stone carving of a Song soldier in mountain pattern armour holding a sword

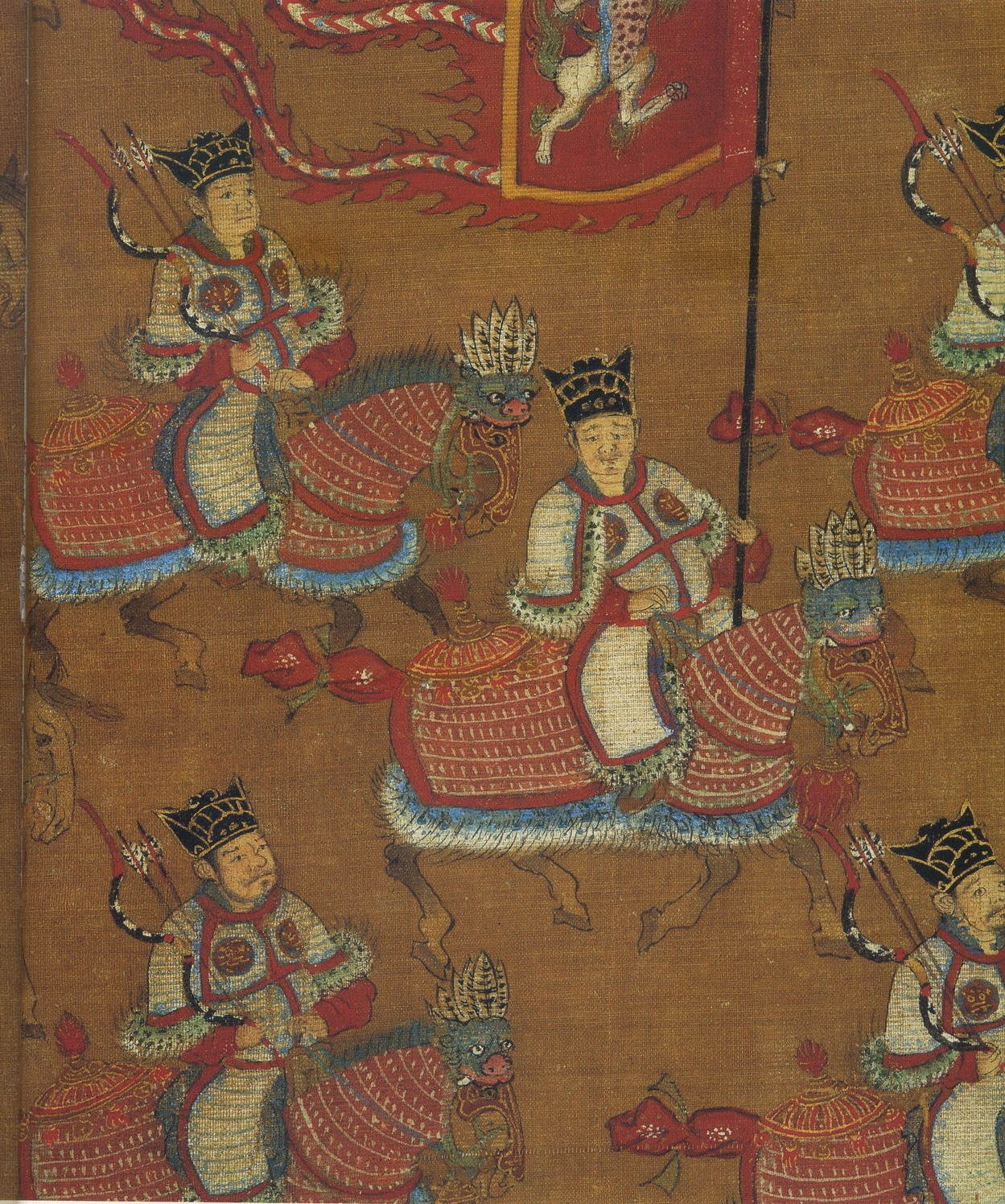
Song dynasty cavalry

=== Army ===
In the year 960 the Song military had 378,000 enlisted soldiers. Around the turn of the 11th century its size had grown to 900,000 soldiers, increasing to 1,000,000 by the year 1022, and well over 1,250,000 by 1041. The overall expenses of upholding a military of this size consumed three-quarters of the state's entire annual revenue. To lessen the expense, in 1069 the Chancellor Wang Anshi created the institution of local militias known as baojia as supporting units. In 1073, Wang Anshi created a new bureau of the central government called the Directorate of Weapons, which supervised the manufacture of armaments and ensured quality control.

The Northern Song military was headed by the Bureau of Military Affairs, the highest level of military administration. Executive officials of the Bureau of Military Affairs were second in position only to the chief councilors. While officially the highest functioning military organ, the Bureau of Military Affairs co-existed with the Three Capital Guards: the Palace Command, the Metropolitan Cavalry Command, and the Metropolitan Infantry Command. Together these two systems served as a mutual check and restraint on each other. Because of the Song's promotion of civil government, the Bureau of Military Affairs became increasingly occupied by civil officials. By the reign of Emperor Zhenzong of Song (r. 8 May 997 – 23 March 1022), only 34 percent of senior officials in the Bureau were military officers. The emperor himself did not directly lead the military.

Technically, the Northern Song maintained a system of three different levels of armies: the upper imperial armies, middle imperial armies, and lower imperial armies. The upper imperial armies alone consisted of four separate armies. However, after the beginning of Emperor Taizong of Song's reign (r. 15 November 976 – 8 May 997), military organization was localized to the commandery level for all practical troop movements, fortifications, and battles. Generals and commandery units were deliberately kept apart and unfamiliar with each other to prevent rebellion.

The Song dynasty did not have military conscription but rather recruited through volunteers. The strong and fit were sent to the capital as models and guides for other soldiers. Soldiers were required to tattoo their faces or arms with the designation of their military unit. Infantry units were organized 50 men to a platoon, two platoons to a company, and five companies to a battalion. During the Northern Song, half of the entire army of 1 million was stationed in and around Kaifeng. The remaining troops were posted in scattered forces along borders and near large municipalities, and in peacetime were used as means to maintain local security. Prefectural armies were created as reserves. They received no military training and were mainly used for industrial labor such as wall and road repair, river dike building, bridge construction, and transportation.

During the Western Xia invasion (1039-1044), the army underwent reforms that saw the creation of "legions" (jiang) of 2,500 to 4,000 men rather than the older 500 men battalions. The legion was formally introduced as an army structure during the New Policies era (1069–1076) of Wang Anshi. The army started using more and better crossbows, known as the Divine Arm Bow, and fielded heavier bladed shields, fewer spears, and more axes and long bladed swords.

Song crossbowmen constituted their own separate units apart from the infantry, and according to the Chinese Wujing Zongyao military manuscript of 1044, the crossbow used in mass was the most effective weapon used against northern nomadic cavalry charges. Elite crossbowmen were also valued as long-range snipers; such was the case when the Liao general Xiao Talin was picked off by a Song crossbow at the Battle of Shanzhou in 1004. Crossbows were mass-produced in state armories with designs improving as time went on, such as the use of a mulberry wood and brass crossbow in 1068 that could pierce a tree at 140 paces. Song cavalry used an array of different weapons, including halberds, swords, bows, and fire lances that discharged a gunpowder blast of flame and shrapnel. In preparation for war, government armories manufactured weapons in enormous quantities, with tens of millions of arrowheads crafted each year, along with armor components by the tens of thousands. There were sixteen known varieties of catapults in the Song period, designed to fit many different proportions and requiring work crews in sizes ranging from dozens to several hundred men.

For a number of reasons such as corruption, focus on civil government, and distrust of the military, the Song army was generally ineffective despite the empire's material wealth. While the culture of the Song dynasty abhorred military subjects, its bureaucracy also codified and implemented new standards for soldiers. The military examination was observed and elite soldiers were allocated different responsibilities based on examination of their individual capabilities. The History of Song notes that the Song army had access to new weapons such as gunpowder bombs and arrows, good armour, and were well supplied with traditional arms, but its military performance in practice still left much to be desired.

=== Cavalry ===
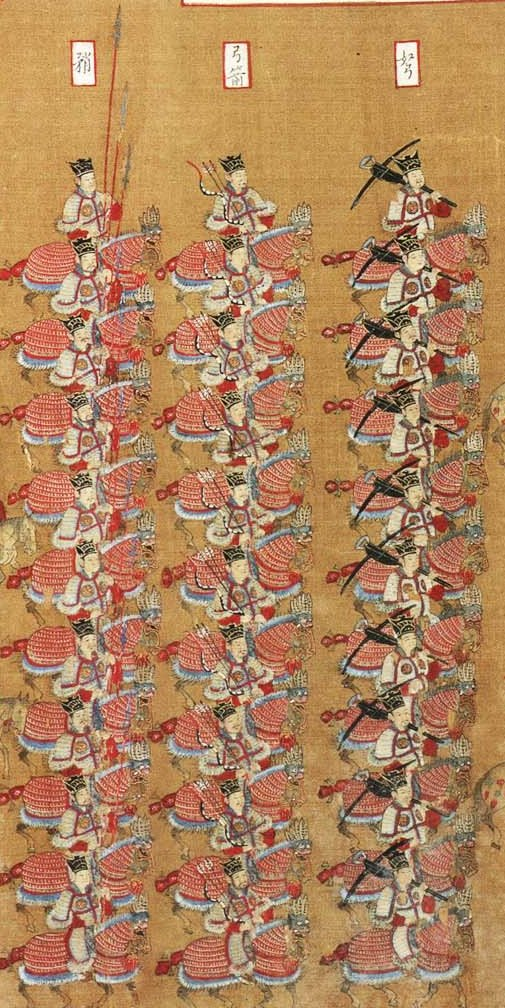
Armoured Song cavalry

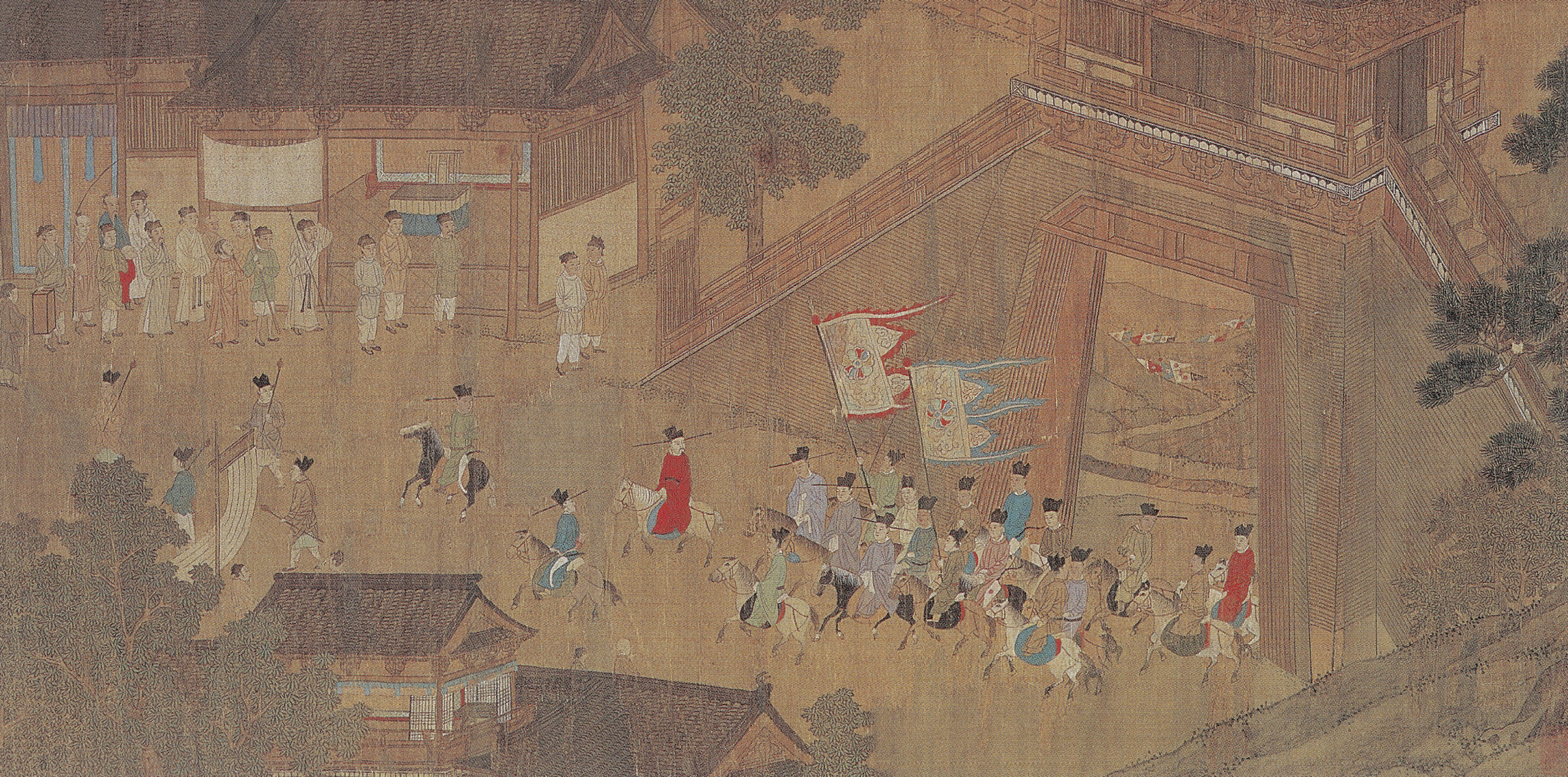
Auspicious Omens by Li Song (1190-1264)

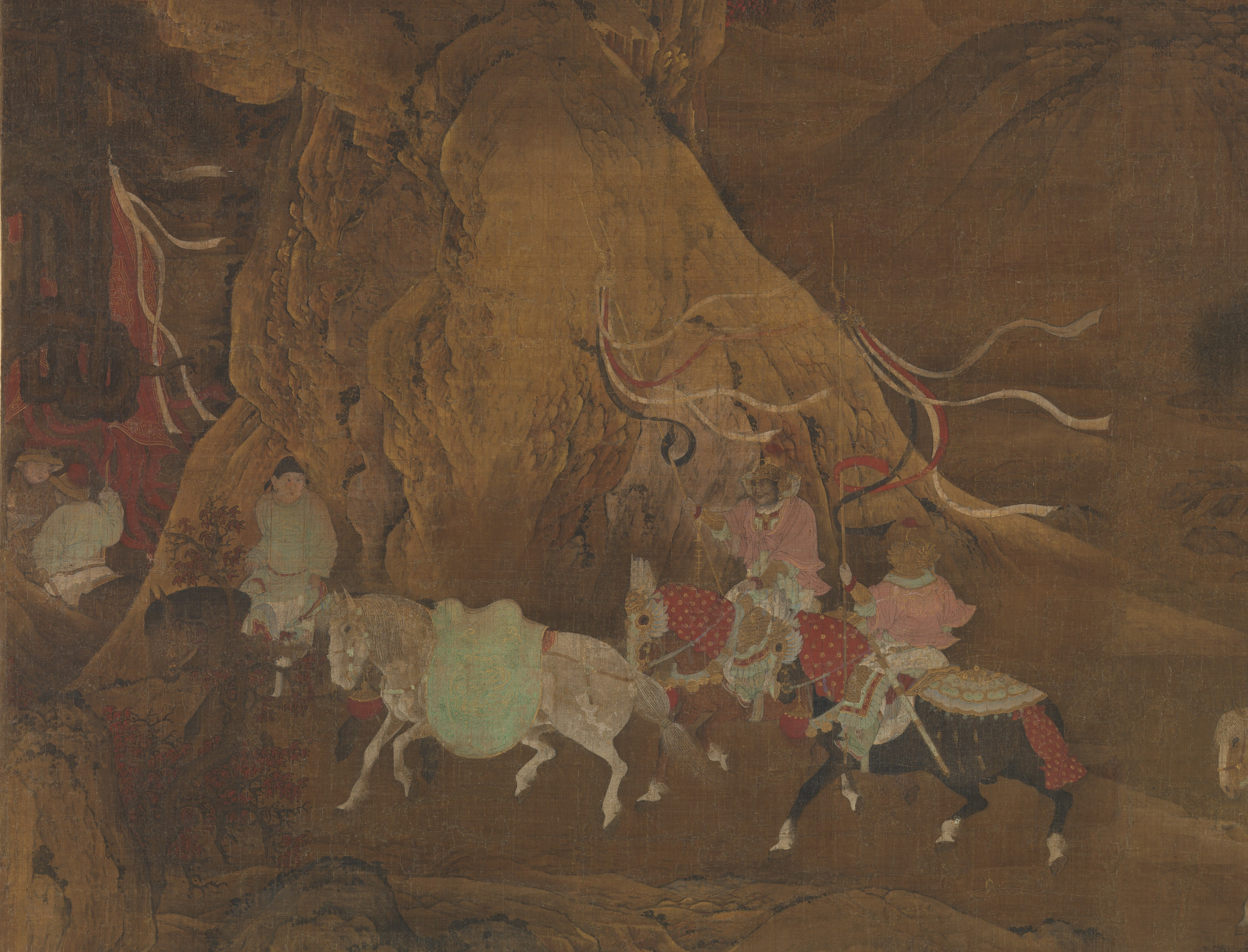
A Song painting of the 12th century showing cavalrymen in the rear with horses wearing armor.

The Song dynasty did not possess much in the way of warhorses. Without the horse-producing lands of the northwest, the Song managed to raise 200,000 horses during the reign of Emperor Zhenzong of Song and 150,000 during the reign of Emperor Shenzong of Song, down from 700,000 during the height of the Tang dynasty. To supplement their cavalry, the Song bought every year ten to forty thousand horses from the northwest and southwest borderlands.

The Dali Kingdom's horses were highly prized and sought after as military assets, especially after the fall of the Northern Song. They were described by a Song official in the following passage:

These horses possess a shape [that is] quite magnificent. They stand low with a muscular front, very similar to the shape of a chicken. The diaphragm is broad, shoulders thick, waist flat, and back round. They are trained to squat on their rear ends like a dog. They easily climb steep terrain on command and possess both speed and agility in chase. They have been raised on bitter buckwheat, so they require little to maintain. How could a horse like this not be considered a good horse?

Due to the lack of their own cavalry forces, the Song army usually had to rely on anti-cavalry infantry equipped with "horse-butchering sabres", large axes, and crossbows to overcome the Khitans and Jurchens.

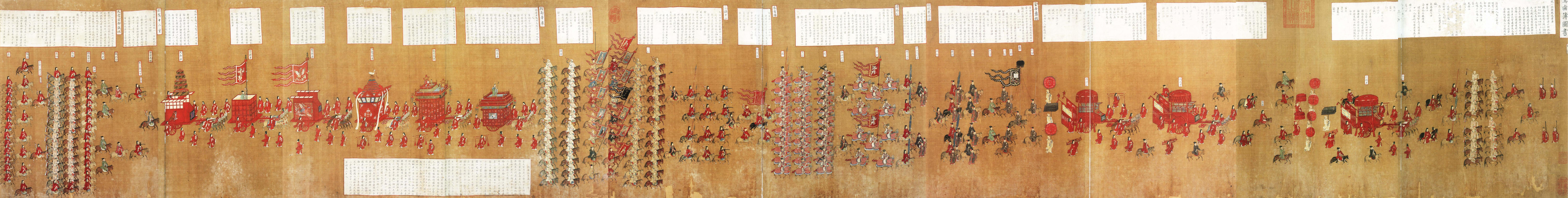
Section of Dajia lubu tushu (Imperial Chariot and Honor Guard), ca. 1053–1065, Song dynasty. Handscroll, 51.4 x 1481 cm

=== Tribal Auxiliaries ===
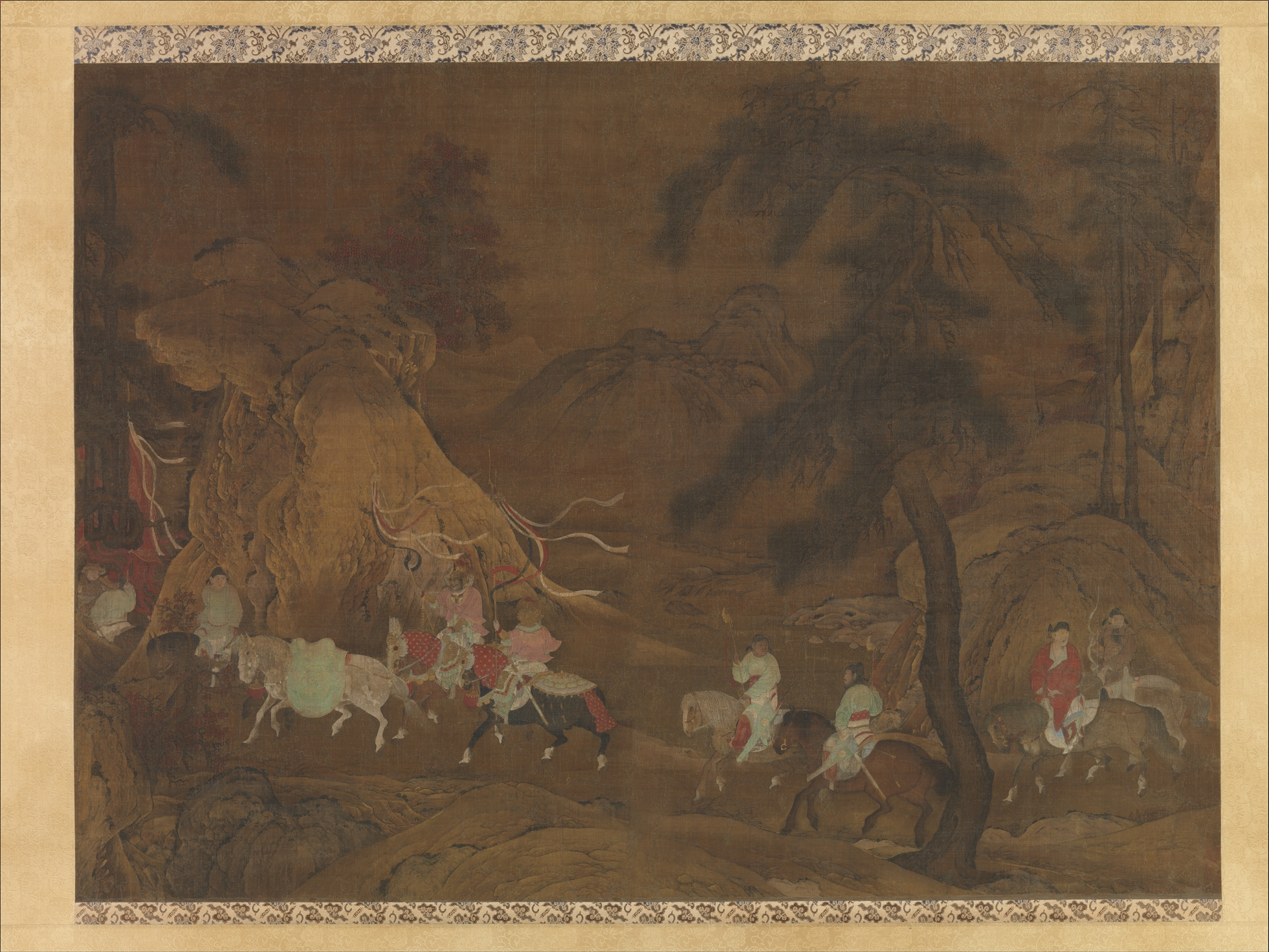
Cavalry as depicted in a 12th c. Song dynasty painting

The Song military included auxiliary forces drawn from frontier ethnic groups. Tribal families under Song rule was referred to as Shuhu. The chief of the tribe was designated as Supreme Unit Master or dujunzhu and smaller tribe leaders were designated commanders (fanguan). Command was hereditary in accordance with tribal customs of chieftainship. The Song government issued them with land. Deployment was permanent and never rotated unlike regular army forces, and promotion or demotion was restricted to the internal structure of each unit. Their promotions were also restricted to Prefect and Garrison-General at the highest level unlike regular officers. In 1017, the fanluo battalions of tribal warriors were formed as part of the Central Imperial Palace army and used to suppress the rebellion of Nong Zhigao in Guangxi. There was strong court resistance to the idea of tribal officers outranking Han Chinese officers, and the government wavered back-and-forth on the policy of permitting this. The tribal auxiliaries were described by both Song sources and their enemies as highly effective.

Tribal auxiliaries included "Western soldiers" (fanbing), drawn from Tibetan and Tangut tribes along the northwestern frontier. These tribes defected to the Song due to inter-tribal conflict and played an essential role in Song defence policy due to the large numbers of cavalry they provided. The Song dynasty took great effort to maintain cordial ties with them. However unlike previous dynasties these forces were restricted to the localities from which they were drawn, rather than deployed to other fronts. The Song elite avoided the multi-ethnic military command structure of the Tang dynasty that preceded it as this was viewed as having led to the devastating An Lushan Rebellion (started by a military governor of foreign descent) that caused the dynasty's decline and collapse. This made the Song reluctant to rely on non-Han Chinese for any purposes.

Han and “western” infantry and cavalry troops have been haphazardly combined into one army. This has already today caused quite a bit of harm, to say nothing of what would happen when they go to war. Since Han and Tibetans speak mutually unintelligible languages, when the troops are garrisoned, it has gotten to the point that mealtime has become inconvenient.

— Li Xian in a 1083 memorial

The Song dynasty did not model its military infrastructure and organization on the precedent of northern nomadic armies, such as the earlier Xianbei and later Mongols. Only twice in the Song era were steppe people employed in Song cavalry units: in the beginning of the dynasty with the campaigns of Emperor Taizu who employed Kumo Xi horse archers, and later 13th century Mongol defectors who came over to fight for the Song.

=== Navy ===
The Song dynasty founder, Emperor Taizu of Song, formerly an army officer, attached great importance to ship building and often visited the shipyard. After the dynasty's founding and the subsequent role the navy played in defeating Later Shu and Southern Tang, the dynasty continued to maintain substantial naval forces for a time. However, after the unsuccessful invasion of Dai Viet in 981, the Song gradually lost interest in the navy, although Guangnan Circuit maintained a "Convoy Escort Squadron" (jiagang shuijun) which accompanied and protected incoming and outgoing merchant ships. By 987, the navy had become an ornamental establishment used for water entertainment. In 1068, the navy was reorganized, and after the Lý–Song War in 1077, the government asked merchants to contribute ships as well. Two shipyards were constructed in Mingzhou and Wenzhou. In 1090, these two shipyards were tasked with constructing 600 ships annually while shipyards in Liangzhe and Huainan received orders to build 300 ships. However the naval authorities deemed these ships to be of inferior quality and resorted to hiring and borrowing private vessels. This proved to be unsustainable and the practice was prohibited in 1112.

After the loss of the north in 1127, the Song established a standing naval force to guard the region between the Huai River and the Changjiang. The Imperial Commissioner for the Control and Organization of the Coastal Areas (yanhai zhizhi shisi) was established in Dinghai county in 1132 with 11 squadrons and 3,000 men under its command. The Song fleet capacity increased to 15 squadrons and 21,000 men by 1174, and 20 squadrons and 52,000 men by 1237. In 1167, another base was established at Xupu to guard the Changjiang and the village that would become Shanghai.

The Song government ran into problems with funding so they paid merchants and constructors with "monk certificates" (dudie) to purchase ships. Honorary ranks and titles were also given in return for ships. Sometimes the ships were taken by force which eventually resulted in many merchants defecting to the Yuan dynasty. Some of the merchant vessels called in by the government were quite large with a beam of 30 feet. These converted ships were known as "Whales." "Whale-head" ships with a capacity of 2,000 liao were also built in government shipyards. The average combat ships of the Song dynasty tended to be smaller with standard 400 liao galleys known as "Sea Hawks" reaching 80 feet in length, 20 feet in breadth, and able to carry 200 men-at-arms. Some Sea Hawks built later on in the dynasty were much larger. In 1169, some were built with a capacity of 800 liao and in 1203, up to 1,000 liao. The large Sea Hawks of 1203 were equipped with iron rams. In comparison, the coastal defense fleet of the Ming dynasty only had ships up to 700 liao in capacity.

[Lin] Zhiping is further instructed to lease sea-going ships from private owners in the districts and towns of Fujian and Guangdong. The seagoing ships he is to charter should be of three types: First class ships with a beam of more than 24 feet, second class ships with a beam of more than 20 feet, and third class ships with a beam of over 18 feet. Each first class ship should have two helmsmen and 40 seamen, each second class ship should have one helmsman and 35 seamen, and each third class ship one helmsman and 25 seamen. The ships must be fully equipped with javelins, iron rams, stone missiles, catapults, huopao (a primitive type of bomb), rockets, and other arms, and also fire prevention apparatus.
The leased ships will be given flags and insignia and will be stationed along the river and other strategic places. Whenever there is an alarm, whether from spies’ reports or from beacon fires, they should immediately proceed [to the threatened place] to render assistance. The ships will be formed into units of ten. Officers will be sent to see that they are properly stationed in the defense areas.

— Song order to lease merchant ships

Many of the warships in the Song navy were paddle-wheel driven crafts. In 1132, a Song minister compared paddle-wheel ships to infantry while Whale-head ships were the cavalry. The Song period also saw the first ships armed with gunpowder weapons such as bombs and fire arrows.

The use of enormous pontoon bridges in the Song era on at least one occasion was essential to victory. The Song built a large floating bridge across the Changjiang in 974; while troops were under attack, the pontoon bridge was used as a means of transport for troops and supplies to the other bank during the early Song conquest of the Southern Tang state.

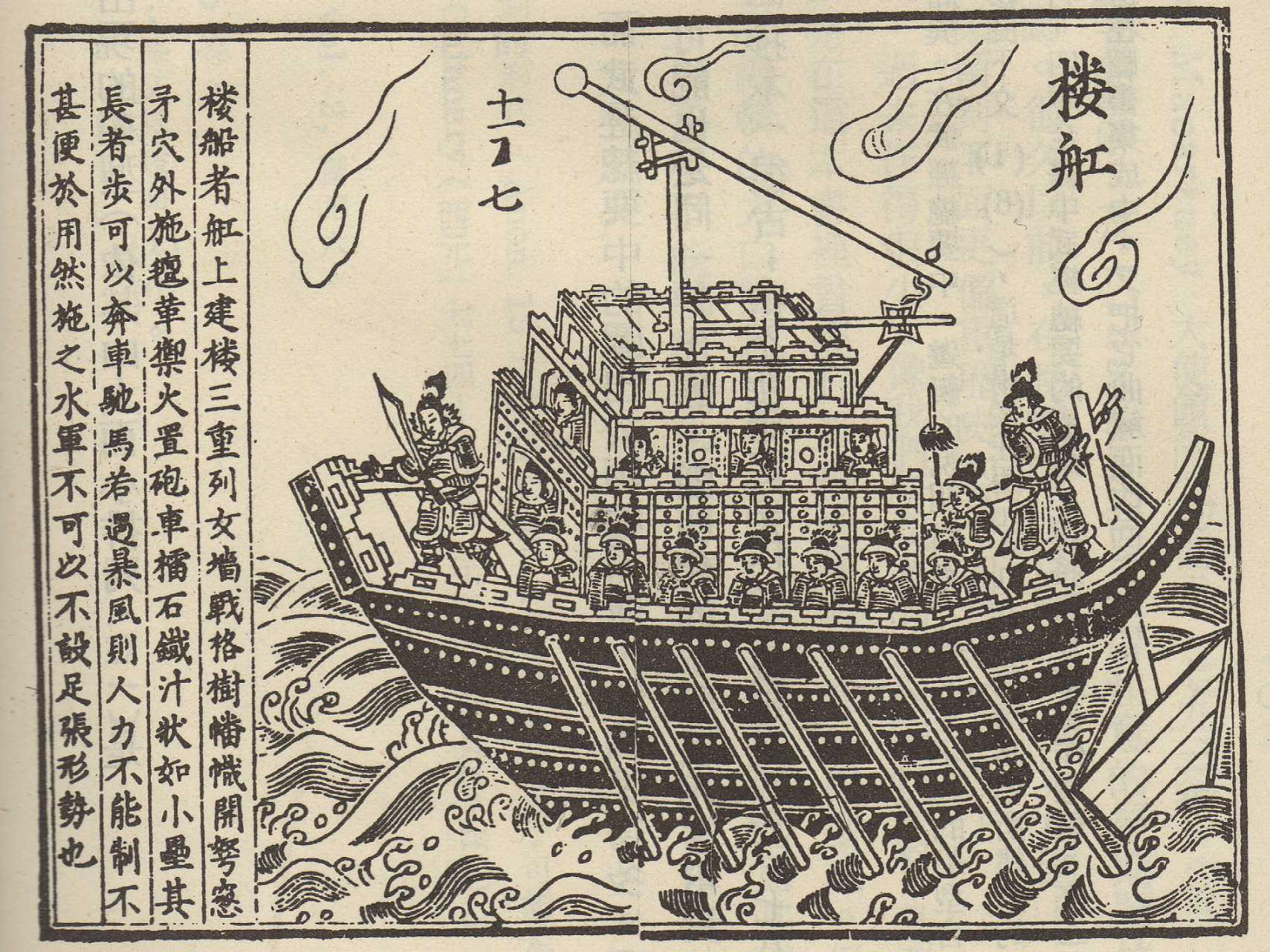
A "tower" ship with a traction-trebuchet on its top deck, from the Wujing Zongyao

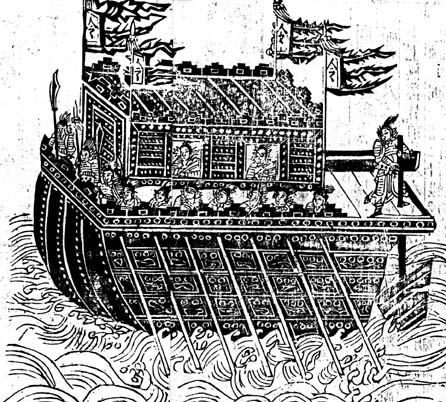
A "combat" ship from the Wujing Zongyao

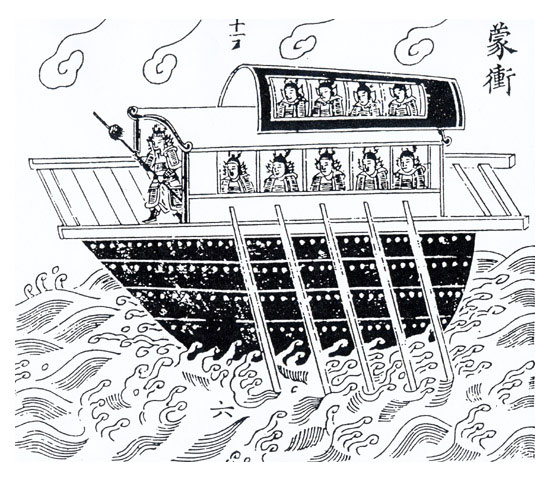
A "covered assault" ship from the Wujing Zongyao

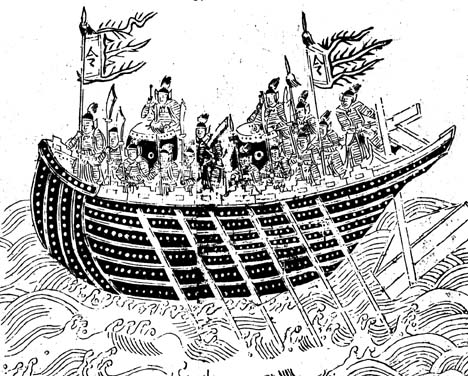
A "flying" barque from the Wujing Zongyao

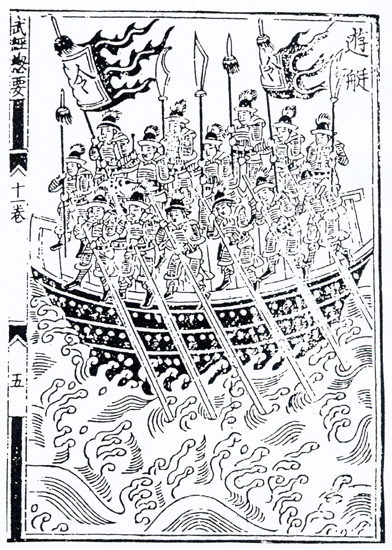
A "patrol" boat from the Wujing Zongyao

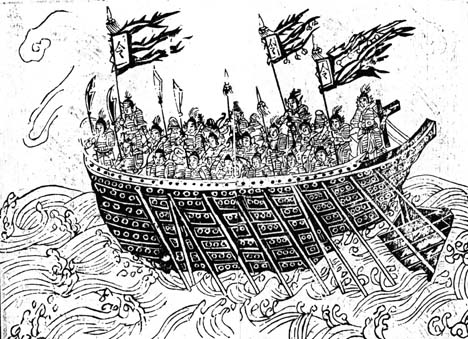
A "sea hawk" ship from the Wujing Zongyao

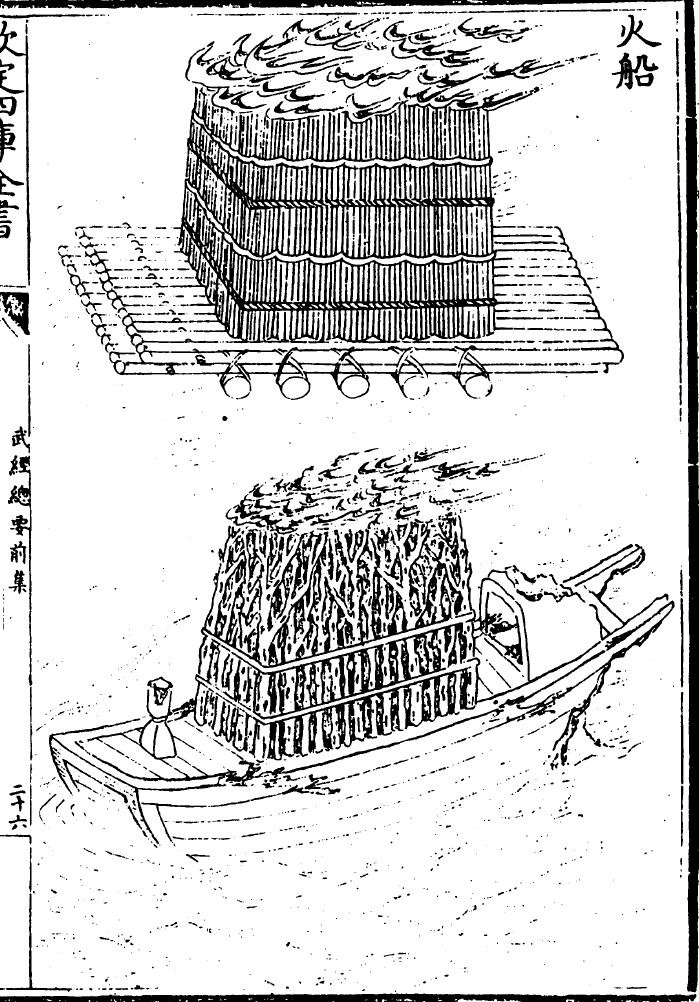
Chinese fire ships from the Wujing Zongyao

=== Weapons production ===
Weapons production was handled through the Armaments Section of the Salt and Iron Monopoly Bureau of the State Finance Commission. However the Armaments Section was abolished during the reign of Emperor Shenzong of Song and replaced with the Directorate for Armaments. Other organizations such as the Armaments Office were also responsible for weapons production. The primary production facilities were located in Kaifeng. There, body armour was produced by the Southern and Northern Workshops (later the Eastern and Western Workshops) while bows and crossbows were produced by the Bow Workshop and Bow and Arrow Workshop. Siege machinery was produced at the Siege Provisioning Workshop. At its height during the Northern Song period, the Bow Workshop had under its employ 1,042 weapons makers, the Bow and Arrow Workshop 1,071 weapons makers, the Southern Workshop 3,741 craftsmen, and the Northern Workshop 4,190 craftsmen. The Southern and Northern Workshops were further divided into the Wood Shop, the Horse Armour Shop, and the Sword-Sharpening Shop. The Siege Provisioning Workshop was also responsible for gunpowder and flamethrower weapons in addition to other siege weapons. In total, the Northern Song dynasty was able to produce every year 32,000 items of iron armour and 22.7 million bows, crossbows, and arrows.

=== Logistics ===
According to Song laws and regulations, camels could carry 150 kg each, horses and mules 165 kg, and donkeys 110 kg. If one soldier could carry 66 kg of food with three food porters, that would last them 31 days.

== Armour ==
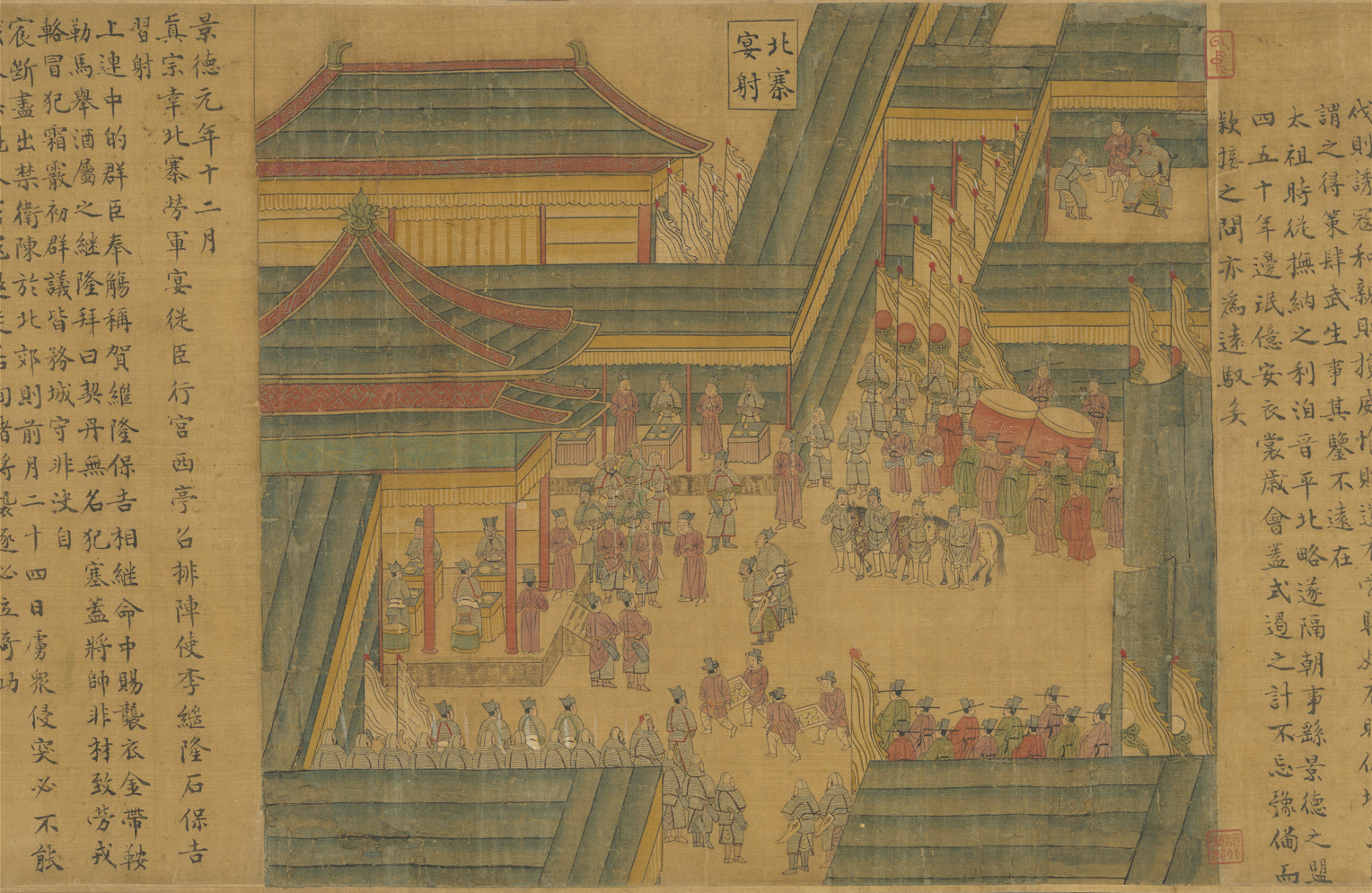
Song soldiers in Four Events of the Jingde Reign (section)

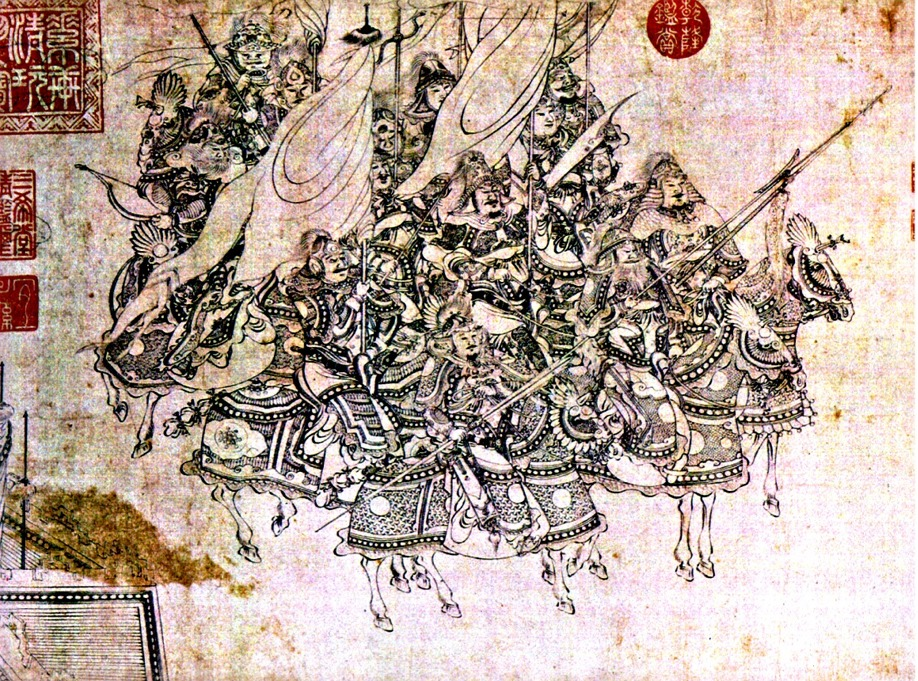
Armoured cavalry of the Song dynasty

During the Song dynasty (960–1279) it became fashionable to create warts on pieces of armour to imitate cold forged steel, a product typically produced by non-Han people in modern Qinghai. Warts created from cold work were actually spots of higher carbon in the original steel, thus aesthetic warts on non-cold forged steel served no purpose. According to Shen Kuo, armour constructed of cold forged steel was impenetrable to arrows shot at a distance of 50 paces. Even if the arrow happened to hit a drill hole, the arrowhead was the one which was ruined. However crossbows were still prized for their ability to penetrate heavy armour.

The History of Song notes that Song "tools of war were exceedingly effective, never before seen in recent times," and "their weapons and armor were very good", but "their troops weren't always effective."

Zhang adds that after ten days of practice over one hundred men succeeded in arming the bow. He also notes that the Song commanders failed in something as simple as keeping signal flags straight. Because of flag confusion Liu Ping had no idea that four battalions of his advance cavalry had already fallen to the enemy, while Commander Zhao Zhen wound up attacking his own son because his banners differed from those used by local battalions. In a similar vein, Yin Zhu deplored the inadequate training of archers and crossbow men in critical short-spear, iron whip, and sword techniques, rendering them impotent and vulnerable in the close-combat situations that Shaanxi's topography made inevitable. Yin observes that each cavalry company was made up of thirteen spear- and flag-men plus eighty-plus archers, while each infantry company comprised eight swordsmen, sixteen spear-men, and seventy-plus crossbow men.

— Zou yuexi duanbing zhuang

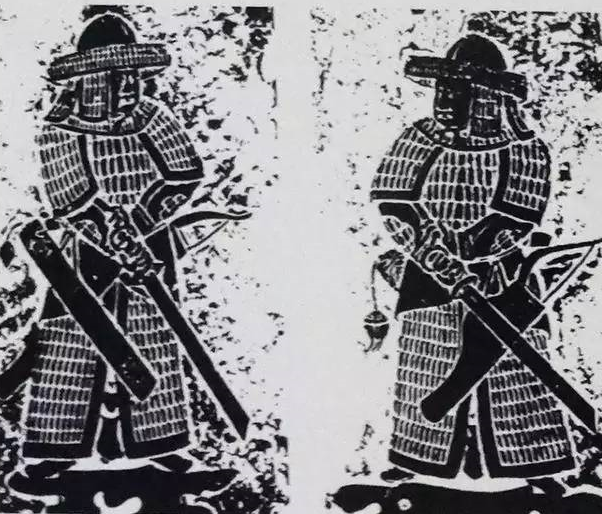
Song guards with lamellar armour

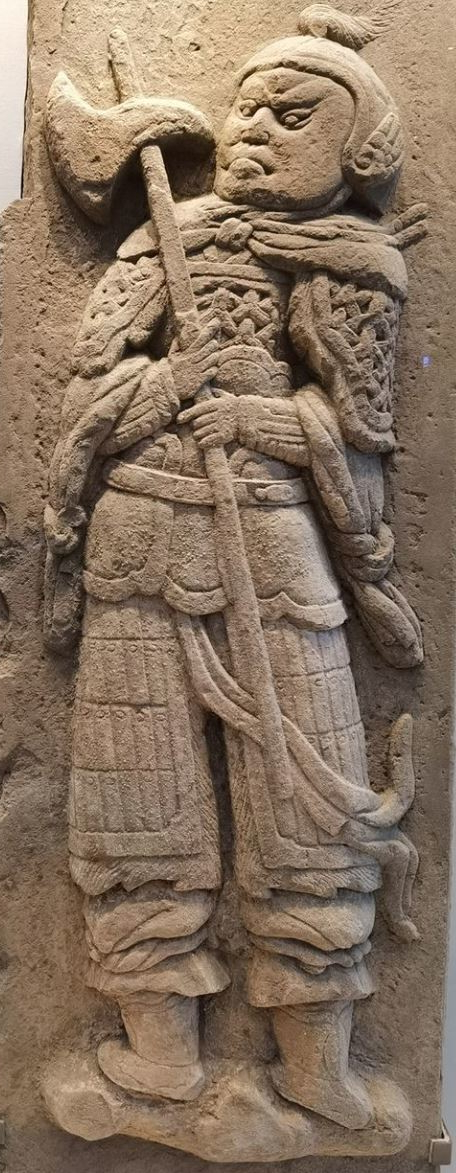
Song dynasty soldier wearing mountain pattern armour

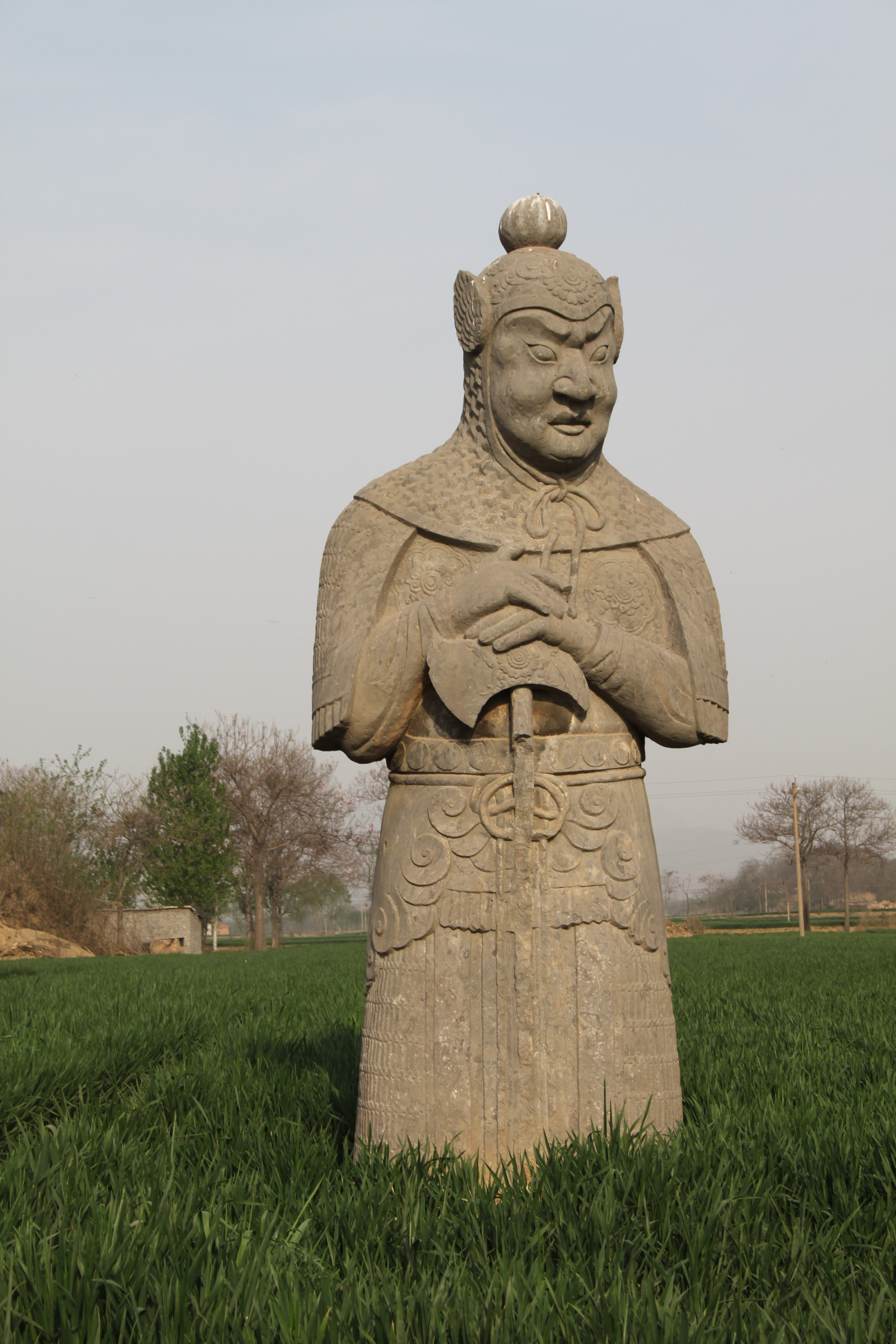
Song tomb guardian in cord and plaque armour, lamellar armour, and a mountain pattern coif

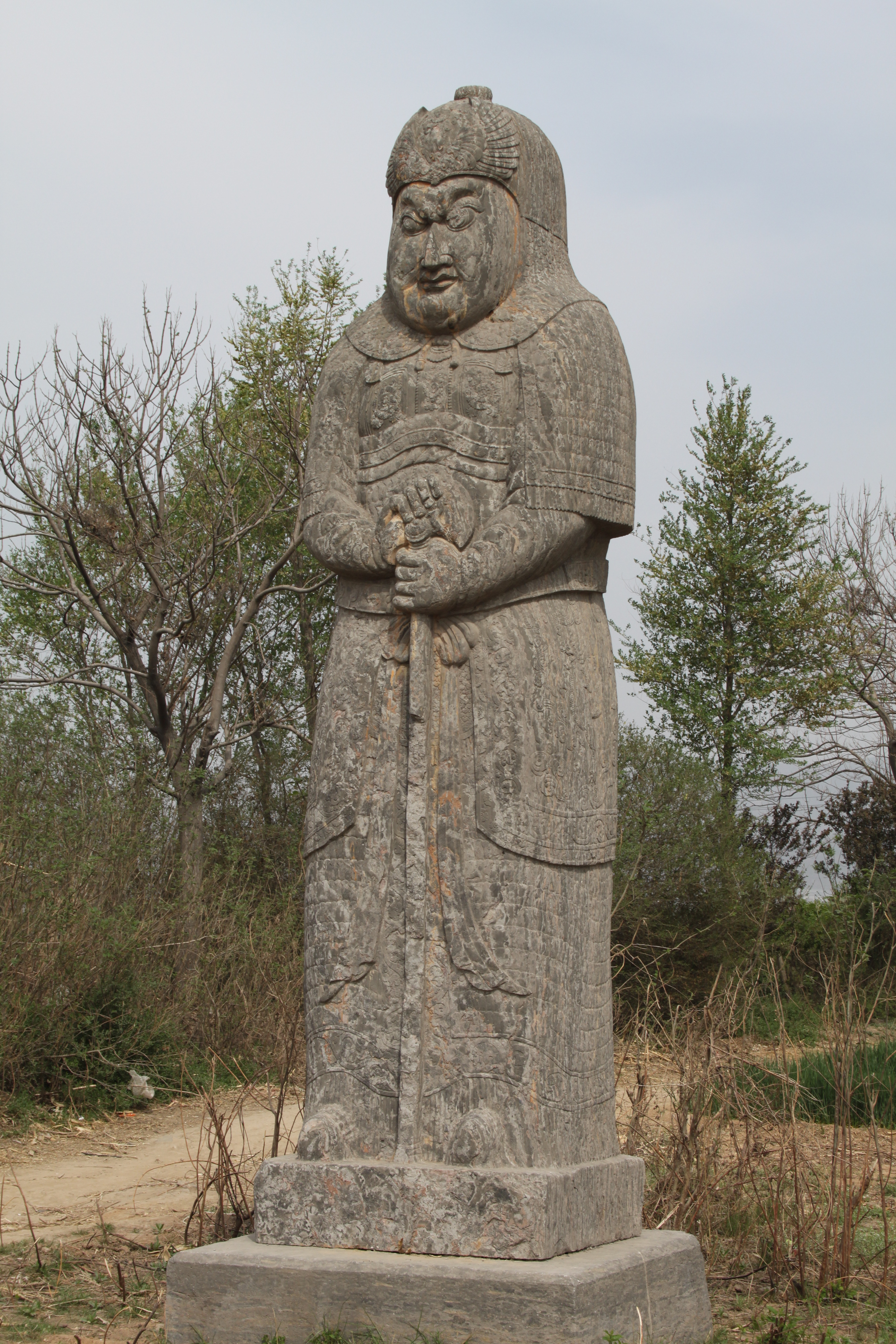
Song tomb guardian in cord and plaque and lamellar armour, holding an axe

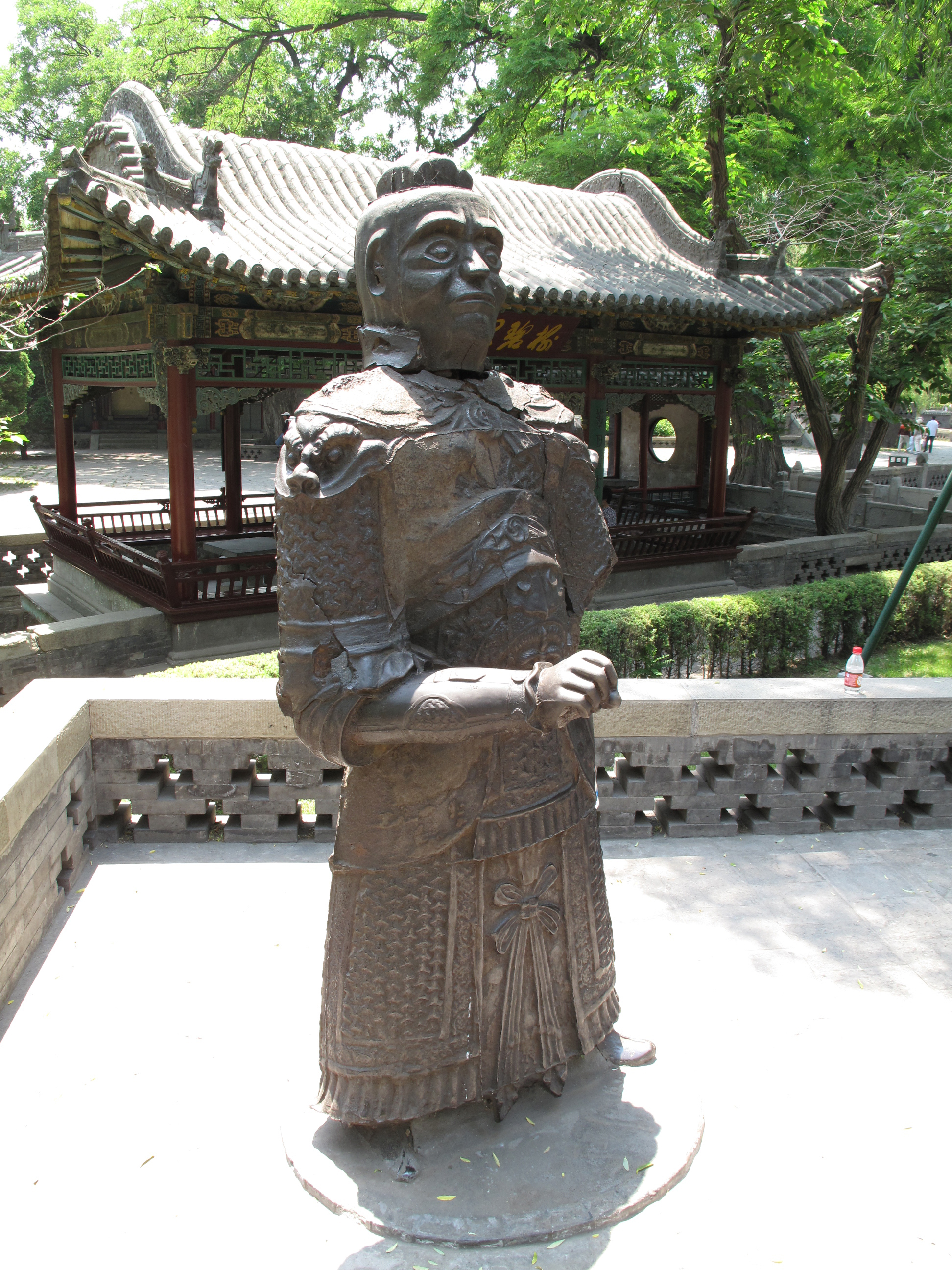
Iron statue depicting mountain pattern armour, Song dynasty, ca. 1094-1098

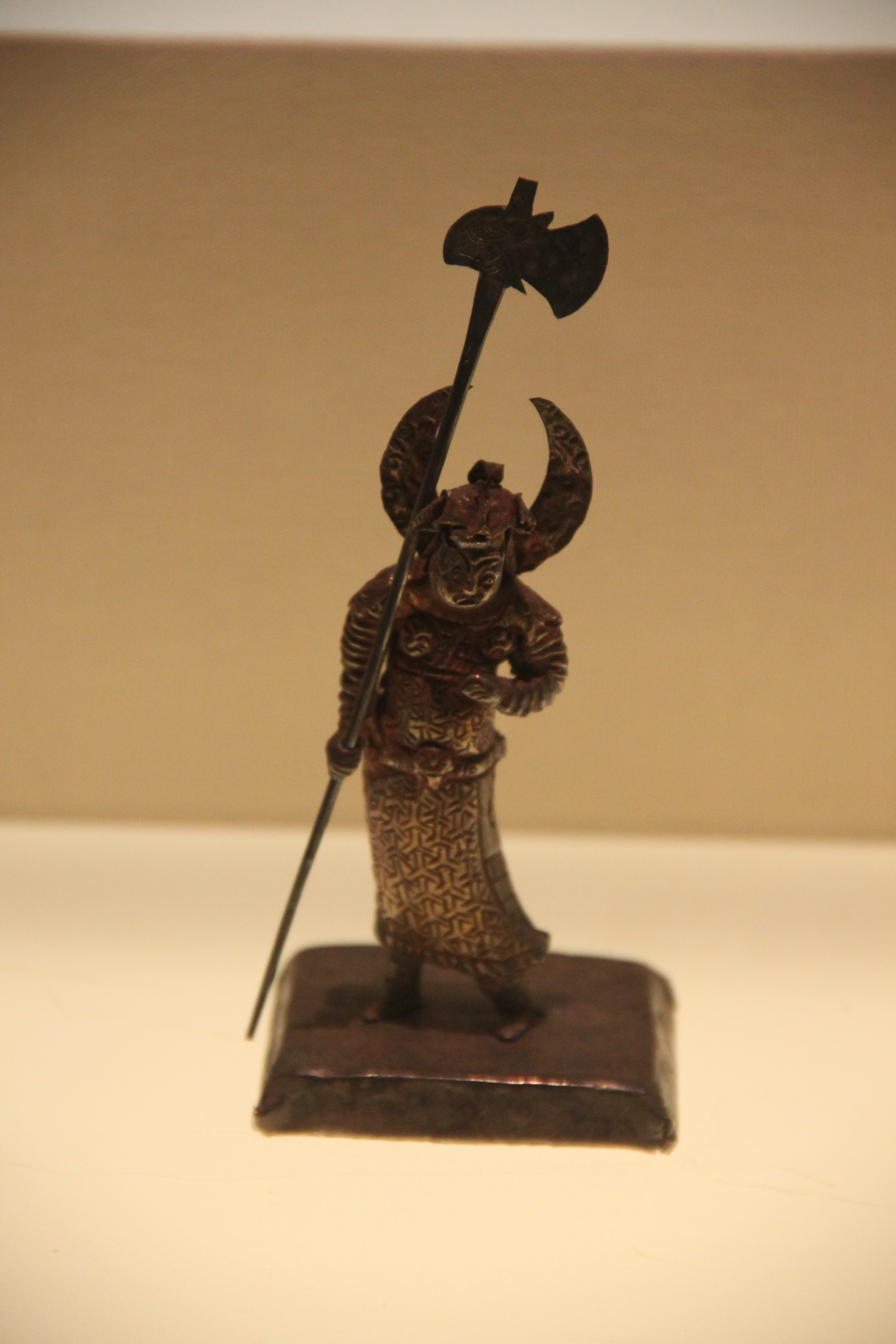
Northern Song figurine of a deity wearing cord and plaque, mountain pattern armour, wielding a large axe

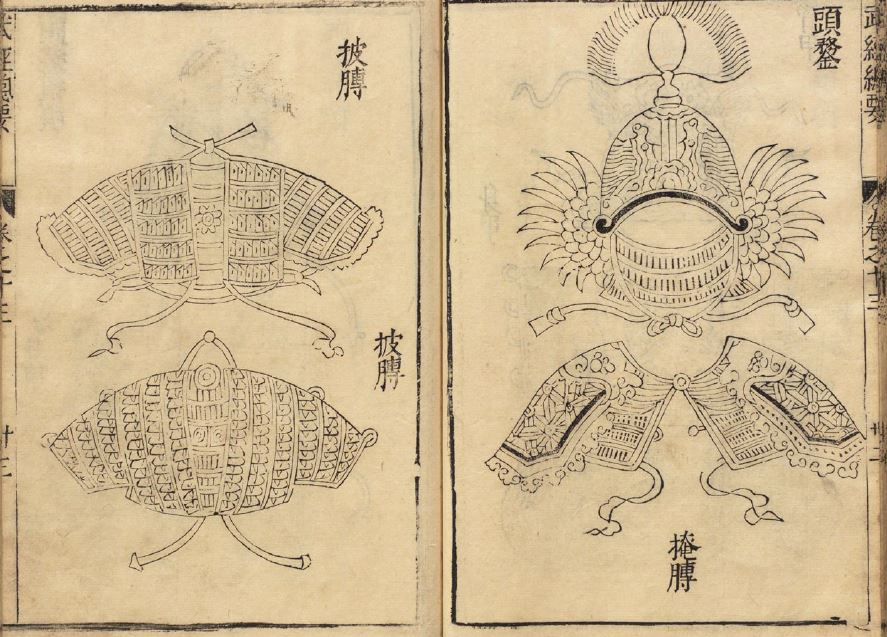
Officer's armor and Winged helmet as illustrated on Wujing Zongyao

== Crossbows ==
=== Countermarch ===
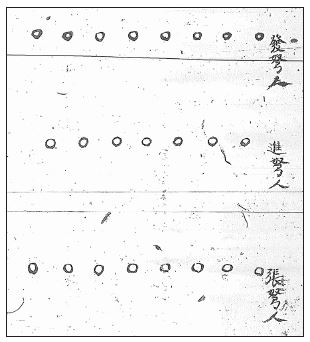
Illustration of a Song crossbow volley fire formation divided into firing, advancing, and reloading lines from top to bottom. From Zeng Gongliang 曾公亮, Complete Essentials for the Military Classics Preceding Volume (Wujing Zongyao qian ji 武 ou總要前集), ca. 1044 CE.

Triple prod mounted crossbow

The Wujing Zongyao, written during the Song dynasty, notes that during the Tang period, crossbows were not used to their full effectiveness due to the fear of cavalry charges. The author's solution was to drill the soldiers to the point where rather than hide behind shieldbearers upon the approach of enemy soldier, they would "plant the feet like a firm mountain, and, unmoving at the front of the battle arrays, shoot thickly to the middle [of the enemy], and none among them will not fall down dead." The Song volley fire formation was described thus: "Those in the center of the formation should load while those on the outside of the formation should shoot, and when [the enemy gets] close, then they should shelter themselves with small shields [literally side shields, 旁牌], each taking turns and returning, so that those who are loading are within the formation. In this way the crossbows will not cease sounding." In addition to the Tang formation, the Song illustration also added a new label to the middle line of crossbowmen between the firing and reloading lines, known as the "advancing crossbows." Both Tang and Song manuals also made aware to the reader that "the accumulated arrows should be shot in a stream, which means that in front of them there must be no standing troops, and across [from them] no horizontal formations."

Regarding the method of using the crossbow, it cannot be mixed up with hand-to-hand weapons, and it is beneficial when shot from high ground facing downwards. It only needs to be used so that the men within the formation are loading while the men in the front line of the formation are shooting. As they come forward they use shields to protect their flanks. Thus each in their turn they draw their crossbows and come up; then as soon as they have shot bolts they return again into the formation. Thus the sound of the crossbows is incessant and the enemy can hardly even flee. Therefore we have the following drill - shooting rank, advancing rank, loading rank.

— Zeng Gongliang

The volley fire technique was used to great effect by the Song during the Jin-Song Wars. In the fall of 1131 the Jin commander Wuzhu (兀朮) invaded the Shaanxi region but was defeated by general Wu Jie (吳 玠) and his younger brother Wu Lin (吳璘). The History of Song elaborates on the battle in detail:

[Wu] Jie ordered his commanders to select their most vigorous bowmen and strongest crossbowmen and to divide them up for alternate shooting by turns (分番迭射). They were called the "Standing-Firm Arrow Teams" (駐隊矢), and they shot continuously without cease, as thick as rain pouring down. The enemy fell back a bit, and then [Wu Jie] attacked with cavalry from the side to cut off the [enemy's] supply routes. [The enemy] crossed the encirclement and retreated, but [Wu Jie] set up ambushes at Shenben and waited. When the Jin troops arrived, [Wu's] ambushers shot, and the many [enemy] were in chaos. The troops were released to attack at night and greatly defeated them. Wuzhu was struck by a flowing arrow and barely escaped with his life.

— History of Song

After losing half his army Wuzhu escaped back to the north, only to invade again in the following year. Again, he was defeated while trying to breach a strategic pass. The History of Song states that during the battle Wu Jie's brother Wu Lin "used the Standing-Firm Arrow Teams, who shot alternately, and the arrows fell like rain, and the dead piled up in layers, but the enemy climbed over them and kept climbing up." This passage is especially noteworthy for its mention of a special technique being utilized as it is one of the very few times that the History of Song has elaborated on a specific tactic.

=== Mounted crossbow ===
Large mounted crossbows known as "bed crossbows" were used as early as the Warring States period. Mozi described them as defensive weapons placed on top the battlements. The Mohist siege crossbow was described as humongous device with frameworks taller than a man and shooting arrows with cords attached so that they could be pulled back. By the Han dynasty, crossbows were used as mobile field artillery and known as "Military Strong Carts". Around the 5th century AD, multiple bows were combined to increase draw weight and length, thus creating the double and triple bow crossbows. Tang versions of this weapon are stated to have obtained a range of 1,160 yards, which is supported by Ata-Malik Juvayni on the use of similar weapons by the Mongols in 1256. According Juvayni, Hulagu Khan brought with him 3,000 giant crossbows from China, for the siege of Nishapur, and a team of Chinese technicians to work a great 'ox bow' shooting large bolts a distance of 2,500 paces, which was used at the siege of Maymun Diz. Constructing these weapons, especially the casting of the large triggers, and their operation required the highest order of technical expertise available at the time. They were primarily used from the 8th to 11th centuries.

Joseph Needham on the range of the triple-bow crossbow:

This range seems credible only with difficulty, yet strangely enough there is a confirmation of it from a Persian source, namely the historian 'Alā'al-Dīn al-Juwainī, who wrote of what happened when one of the almost impregnable castles of the Assassins was taken by Hulagu Khan. Here, in +1256, the Chinese arcuballistae shot their projectiles 2500 (Arab) paces (1,100 yards) from a position on the top of some mountain... His actual words are: "and a kamān-i-gāu which had been constructed by Cathayan craftsmen, and which had a range of 2500 paces, was brought to bear on those fools, when no other remedy remained, and of the devil-like Heretics many soldiers were burnt by those meteoric shots". The castle in question was not Alamūt itself, but Maimūn-Diz, also in the Elburz range, and it was the strongest military base of the Assassins.

— Joseph Needham

== Gunpowder weapons ==
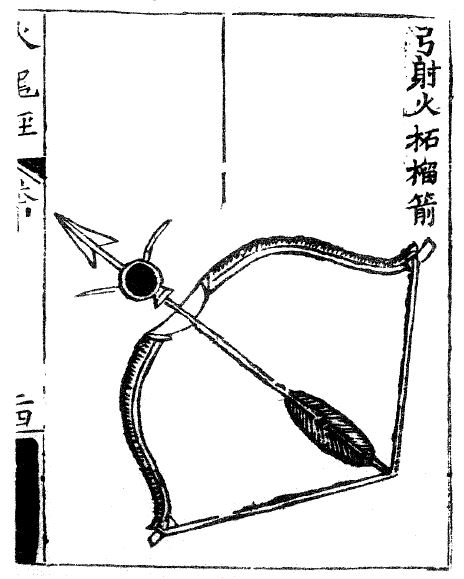
A fire arrow utilizing a bag of gunpowder as incendiary. As depicted in the Huolongjing (c. 1390).

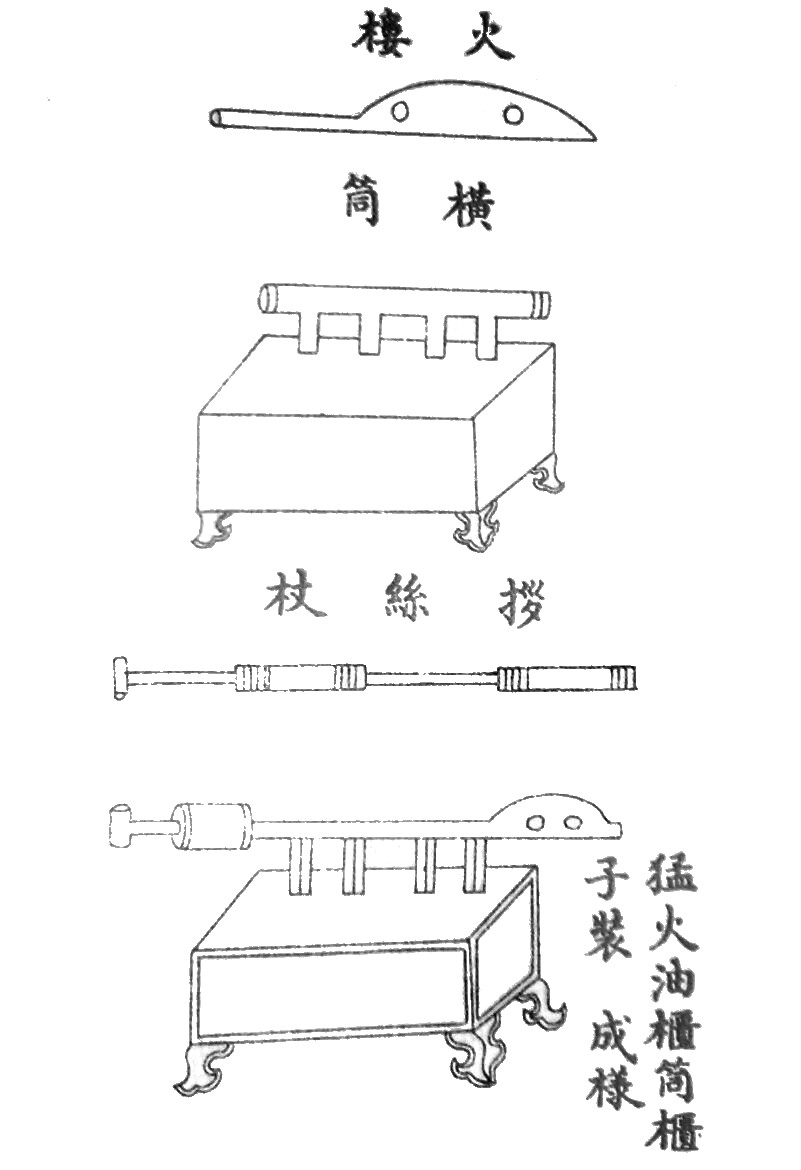
A Chinese flamethrower from the Wujing Zongyao manuscript of 1044 AD, Song Dynasty. The text reads from top to bottom: ignition chamber, horizontal tank, piston rod, and fierce-fire oil tank cabinet installed form.

=== Gunpowder formula ===
The earliest surviving chemical formula of gunpowder dates to 1044 in the form of the military manual Wujing Zongyao, also known in English as the Complete Essentials for the Military Classics, which contains a collection of factoids on Chinese weaponry. The Wujing Zongyao served as a repository of antiquated or fanciful weaponry, and this applied to gunpowder as well, suggesting that it had already been weaponized long before the invention of what would today be considered conventional firearms. These types of gunpowder weapons styles an assortment of odd names such as "flying incendiary club for subjugating demons", "caltrop fire ball", "ten-thousand fire flying sand magic bomb", "big bees nest", "burning heaven fierce fire unstoppable bomb", "fire bricks" which released "flying swallows", "flying rats", "fire birds", and "fire oxen". Eventually they gave way and coalesced into a smaller number of dominant weapon types, notably gunpowder arrows, bombs, and guns. This was most likely because some weapons were deemed too onerous or ineffective to deploy.

=== Fire arrow ===
The first fire arrows (huǒyào 火藥) were arrows strapped with gunpowder incendiaries, but in 969 two Song generals, Yue Yifang and Feng Jisheng (馮繼升), invented a variant fire arrow which utilized gunpowder tubes as propellants. Afterwards fire arrows started transitioning to rocket propelled weapons rather than being fired from a bow. These fire arrows were shown to the emperor in 970 when the head of a weapons manufacturing bureau sent Feng Jisheng to demonstrate the gunpowder arrow design, for which he was heavily rewarded.

In 975, the state of Wuyue sent to the Song dynasty a unit of soldiers skilled in the handling of fire arrows. In the same year, the Song dynasty used fire arrows and incendiary bombs to destroy the fleet of Southern Tang.

In 994, the Liao dynasty attacked the Song and laid siege to Zitong with 100,000 troops. They were repelled with the aid of fire arrows. In 1000 a soldier by the name of Tang Fu (唐福) also demonstrated his own designs of gunpowder arrows, gunpowder pots (a proto-bomb which spews fire), and gunpowder caltrops, for which he was richly rewarded as well. The imperial court took great interest in the progress of gunpowder developments and actively encouraged as well as disseminated military technology. For example, in 1002 a local militia man named Shi Pu (石普) showed his own versions of fireballs and gunpowder arrows to imperial officials. They were so astounded that the emperor and court decreed that a team would be assembled to print the plans and instructions for the new designs to promulgate throughout the realm. The Song court's policy of rewarding military innovators was reported to have "brought about a great number of cases of people presenting technology and techniques" (器械法式) according to the official History of Song. Production of gunpowder and fire arrows heavily increased in the 11th century as the court centralized the production process, constructing large gunpowder production facilities, hiring artisans, carpenters, and tanners for the military production complex in the capital of Kaifeng. One surviving source circa 1023 lists all the artisans working in Kaifeng while another notes that in 1083 the imperial court sent 100,000 gunpowder arrows to one garrison and 250,000 to another. Evidence of gunpowder in the Liao dynasty and Western Xia is much sparser than in Song, but some evidence such as the Song decree of 1073 that all subjects were henceforth forbidden from trading sulfur and saltpeter across the Liao border, suggests that the Liao were aware of gunpowder developments to the south and coveted gunpowder ingredients of their own.

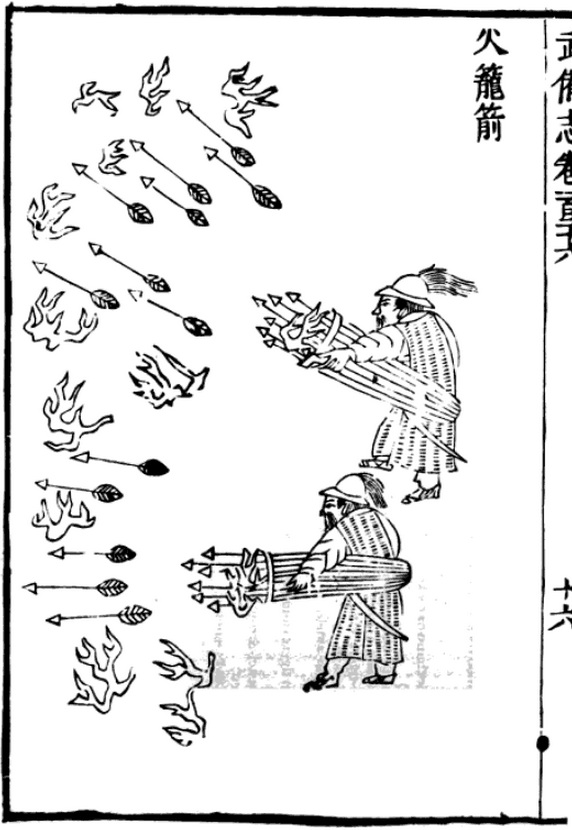
Fire arrow launchers as depicted in the Wubei Zhi (1621). The launcher is constructed using basketry.

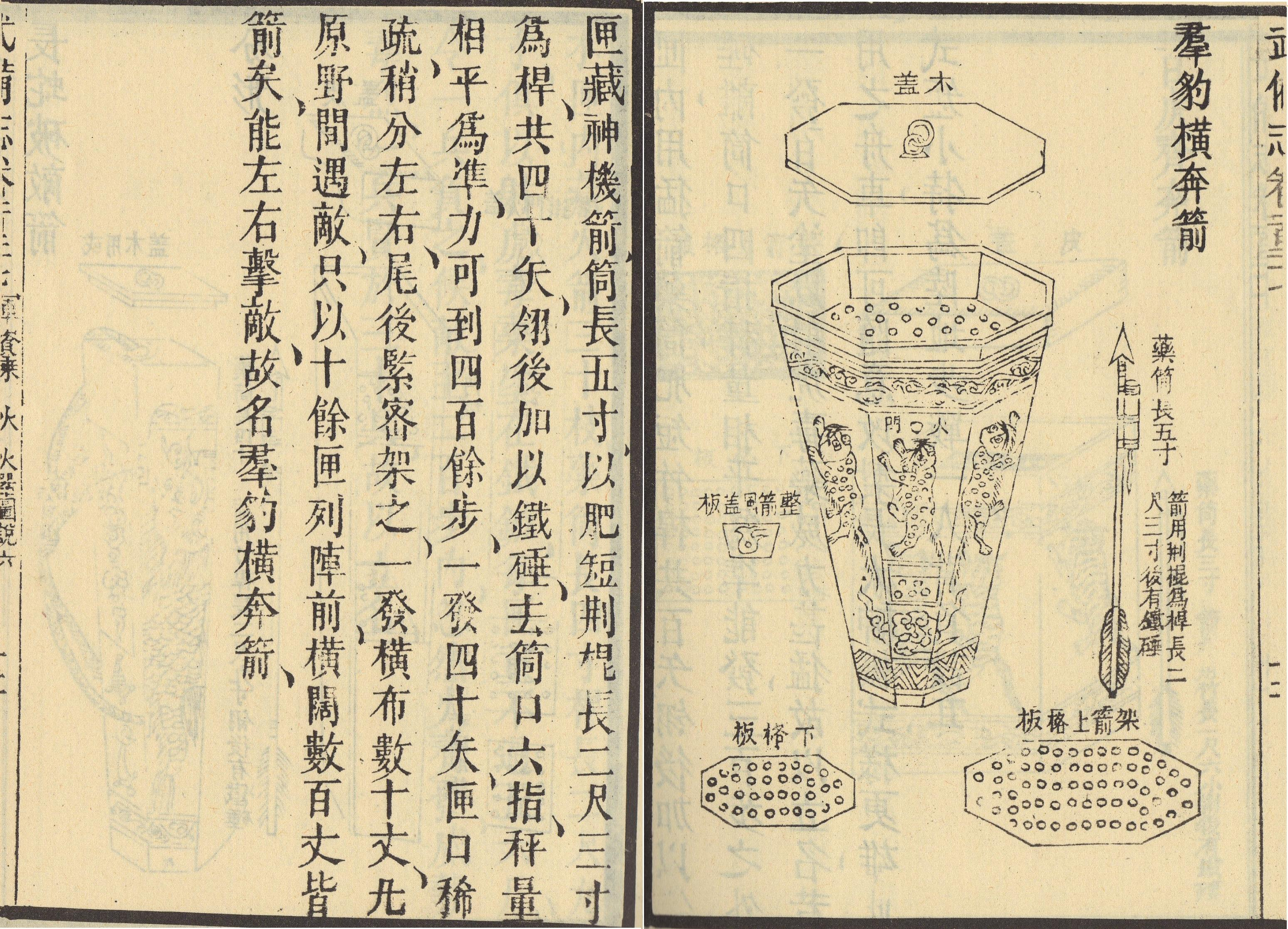
A "charging leopard pack" arrow rocket launcher as depicted in the Wubei Zhi.

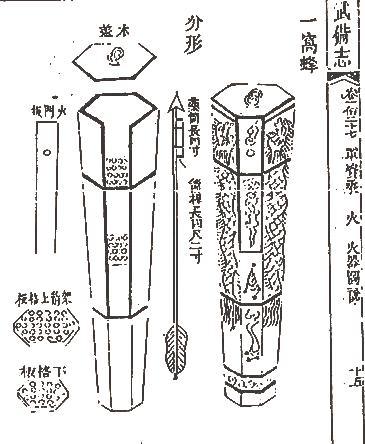
A "nest of bees" (yi wo feng 一窩蜂) arrow rocket launcher as depicted in the Wubei Zhi. So called because of its hexagonal honeycomb shape.

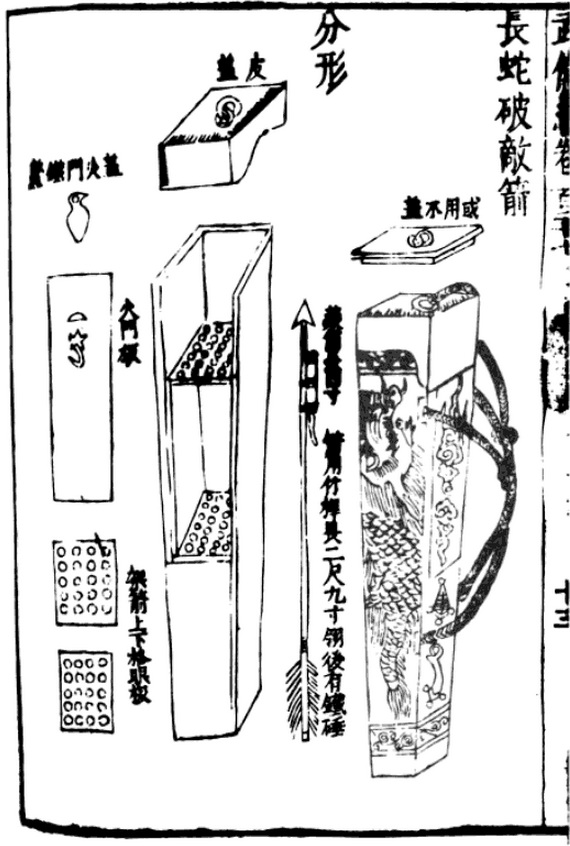
A "long serpent enemy breaking" fire arrow launcher as depicted in the Wubei Zhi. It carries 32 medium small poisoned rockets and comes with a sling to carry on the back.

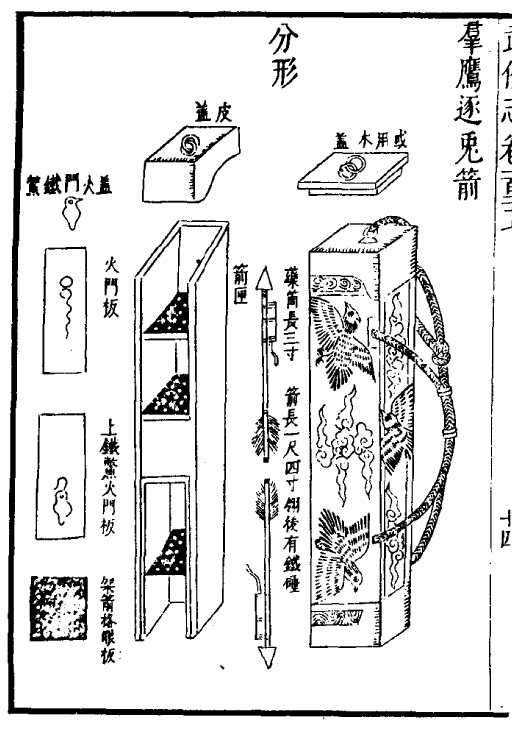
The 'convocation of eagles chasing hare' rocket launcher from the Wubei Zhi. A double-ended rocket pod that carries 30 small poisoned rockets on each end for a total of 60 rockets. It carries a sling for transport.

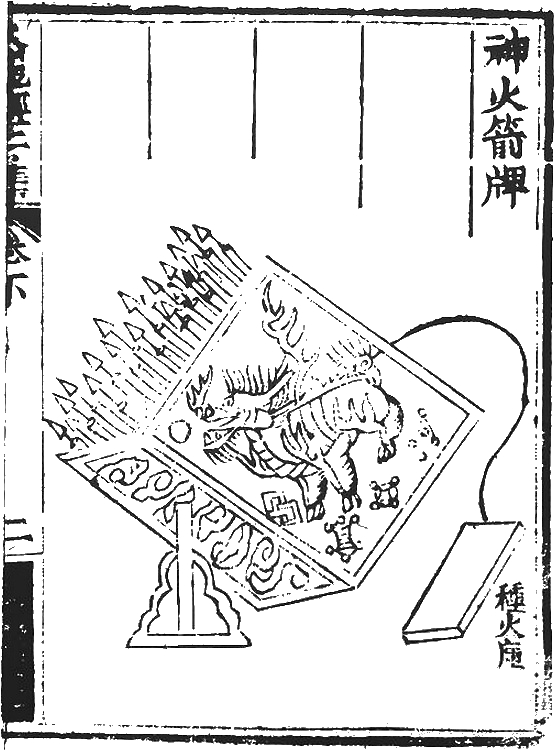
The 'divine fire arrow screen' from the Huolongjing. A stationary arrow launcher that carries one hundred fire arrows. It is activated by a trap-like mechanism, possibly of wheellock design.

=== Flamethrower ===
The Chinese flamethrower, known as the Fierce-fire Oil Cabinet, was recorded to have been used in 976 AD when Song naval forces confronted the Southern Tang fleet on the Changjiang. Southern Tang forces attempted to use flamethrowers against the Song navy, but were accidentally consumed by their own fire when violent winds swept in their direction.

The flamethrower was a well known device by the 11th century when it was joked that Confucian scholars knew it better than the classics. Both gunpowder and the fierce fire oil were produced under the Arsenals Administration of the Song dynasty. In the early 12th century AD, Kang Yuzhi recorded his memories of military commanders testing out fierce oil fire on a small lakelet. They would spray it about on the opposite bank that represented the enemy camp. The flames would ignite into a sheet of flame, destroying the wooden fortifications, and even killing the water plants, fishes and turtles. In 1126 AD, Li Gang used flamethrowers in an attempt to prevent the Jurchens from crossing the Yellow River. Illustrations and descriptions of mobile flamethrowers on four-wheel push carts were documented in the Wujing Zongyao, written in 1044 AD (its illustration redrawn in 1601 as well).

=== Explosives ===
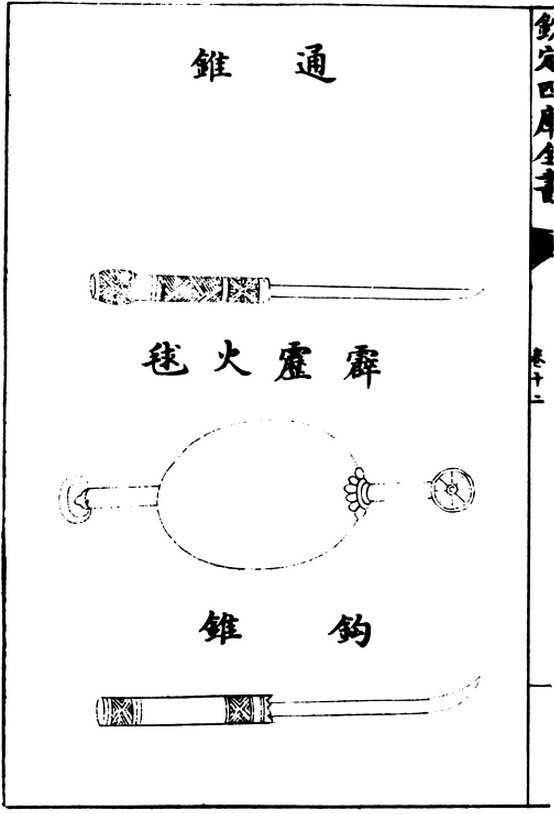
An illustration of a thunderclap bomb as depicted in the 1044 text Wujing Zongyao. The top item is a through awl and the bottom one is a hook awl, used to ignite the projectile before it was hurled.

Gunpowder bombs had been mentioned since the 11th century. In 1000 AD, a soldier by the name of Tang Fu (唐福) demonstrated a design of gunpowder pots (a proto-bomb which spews fire) and gunpowder caltrops, for which he was richly rewarded. In the same year, Xu Dong wrote that trebuchets used bombs that were like "flying fire", suggesting that they were incendiaries. In the military text Wujing Zongyao of 1044, bombs such as the "ten-thousand fire flying sand magic bomb", "burning heaven fierce fire unstoppable bomb", and "thunderclap bomb" (pilipao) were mentioned. However detailed accounts of their use did not appear until the 12th century.

The Jurchen people of Manchuria united under Wanyan Aguda and established the Jin dynasty in 1115. Allying with the Song, they rose rapidly to the forefront of East Asian powers and defeated the Liao dynasty in a short span of time. Remnants of the Liao fled to the west and became known as the Qara Khitai, or Western Liao to the Chinese. In the east, the fragile Song-Jin alliance dissolved once the Jin saw how badly the Song army had performed against Liao forces. The Jin grew tired of waiting and captured all five of the Liao capitals themselves. They proceeded to make war on Song, initiating the Jin-Song Wars. This was the first time two major powers would have access to equally formidable gunpowder weapons.

Initially the Jin expected their campaign in the south to proceed smoothly given how poorly the Song had fared against the Liao. However they were met with stout resistance upon besieging Kaifeng in 1126 and faced the usual array of gunpowder arrows and fire bombs, but also a weapon called the "thunderclap bomb" (霹靂炮), which one witness wrote, "At night the thunderclap bombs were used, hitting the lines of the enemy well, and throwing them into great confusion. Many fled, screaming in fright." The thunderclap bomb was previously mentioned in the Wujing Zongyao, but this was the first recorded instance of its use. Its description in the text reads thus:

The thunderclap bomb contains a length of two or three internodes of dry bamboo with a diameter of 1.5 in. There must be no cracks, and the septa are to be retained to avoid any leakage. Thirty pieces of thin broken porcelain the size of iron coins are mixed with 3 or 4 lb of gunpowder, and packed around the bamboo tube. The tube is wrapped within the ball, but with about an inch or so protruding at each end. A (gun)powder mixture is then applied all over the outer surface of the ball.

— Wujing Zongyao

Jin troops withdrew with a ransom of Song silk and treasure but returned several months later with their own gunpowder bombs manufactured by captured Song artisans. According to historian Wang Zhaochun, the account of this battle provided the "earliest truly detailed descriptions of the use of gunpowder weapons in warfare." Records show that the Jin utilized gunpowder arrows and trebuchets to hurl gunpowder bombs while the Song responded with gunpowder arrows, fire bombs, thunderclap bombs, and a new addition called the "molten metal bomb" (金汁炮). As the Jin account describes, when they attacked the city's Xuanhua Gate, their "fire bombs fell like rain, and their arrows were so numerous as to be uncountable." The Jin captured Kaifeng despite the appearance of the molten metal bomb and secured another 20,000 fire arrows for their arsenal.

The molten metal bomb appeared again in 1129 when Song general Li Yanxian (李彥仙) clashed with Jin forces while defending a strategic pass. The Jin assault lasted day and night without respite, using siege carts, fire carts, and sky bridges, but each assault was met with Song soldiers who "resisted at each occasion, and also used molten metal bombs. Wherever the gunpowder touched, everything would disintegrate without a trace."

=== Fire lance ===
The fire lance, as implied by the name, is essentially a long spear or pole affixed with a tube of gunpowder, and as it saw more usage, the tube's length became longer and pellets were added to the composition. The earliest confirmed employment of the fire lance in warfare was by Song dynasty forces against the Jin in 1132 during the siege of De'an (modern Anlu, Hubei Province).

The Jin attacked with wooden siege towers called "sky bridges": "As the sky bridges became stuck fast, more than ten feet from the walls and unable to get any closer, [the defenders] were ready. From below and above the defensive structures they emerged and attacked with fire lances, striking lances, and hooked sickles, each in turn. The people [i.e., the porters] at the base of the sky bridges were repulsed. Pulling their bamboo ropes, they [the porters] ended up drawing the sky bridge back in an anxious and urgent rush, going about fifty paces before stopping." The surviving porters then tried once again to wheel the sky bridges into place but Song soldiers emerged from the walls in force and made a direct attack on the sky bridge soldiers while defenders on the walls threw bricks and shot arrows in conjunction with trebuchets hurling bombs and rocks. The sky bridges were also set fire to with incendiary bundles of grass and firewood. Li Heng, the Jin commander, decided to lift the siege and Jin forces were driven back with severe casualties.

The siege of De'an marks an important transition and landmark in the history of gunpowder weapons as the fire medicine of the fire lances were described using a new word: "fire bomb medicine" (火炮藥), rather than simply "fire medicine." This could imply the use of a new more potent formula, or simply an acknowledgement of the specialized military application of gunpowder. Peter Lorge suggests that this "bomb powder" may have been corned, making it distinct from normal gunpowder. Evidence of gunpowder firecrackers also points to their appearance at roughly around the same time fire medicine was making its transition in the literary imagination. Fire lances continued to be used as anti-personnel weapons into the Ming dynasty, and were even attached to battle carts on one situation in 1163. Song commander Wei Sheng constructed several hundred of these carts known as "at-your-desire-war-carts" (如意戰車), which contained fire lances protruding from protective covering on the sides. They were used to defend mobile trebuchets that hurled fire bombs.

=== Naval bombs ===
Gunpowder technology also spread to naval warfare and in 1129 Song decreed that all warships were to be fitted with trebuchets for hurling gunpowder bombs. Older gunpowder weapons such as fire arrows were also utilized. In 1159 a Song fleet of 120 ships caught a Jin fleet at anchor near Shijiu Island (石臼島) off the shore of Shandong peninsula. The Song commander "ordered that gunpowder arrows be shot from all sides, and wherever they struck, flames and smoke rose up in swirls, setting fire to several hundred vessels." Song forces took another victory in 1161 when Song paddle boats ambushed a Jin transport fleet, launched thunderclap bombs, and drowned the Jin force in the Yangtze.

The men inside them paddled fast on the treadmills, and the ships glided forwards as though they were flying, yet no one was visible on board. The enemy thought that they were made of paper. Then all of a sudden a thunderclap bomb was let off: It was made with paper (carton) and filled with lime and sulphur. (Launched from trebuchets) these thunderclap bombs came dropping down from the air, and upon meeting the water exploded with a noise like thunder, the sulphur bursting into flames. The carton case rebounded and broke, scattering the lime to form a smoky fog which blinded the eyes of men and horses so that they could see nothing. Our ships then went forward to attack theirs, and their men and horses were all drowned, so that they were utterly defeated.

— Hai Qiu Fu

According to a minor military official by the name of Zhao Wannian (趙萬年), thunderclap bombs were used again to great effect by the Song during the Jin siege of Xiangyang in 1206–1207. Both sides had gunpowder weapons, but the Jin troops only used gunpowder arrows for destroying the city's moored vessels. The Song used fire arrows, fire bombs, and thunderclap bombs. Fire arrows and bombs were used to destroy Jin trebuchets. The thunderclap bombs were used on Jin soldiers themselves, causing foot soldiers and horsemen to panic and retreat. "We beat our drums and yelled from atop the city wall, and simultaneously fired our thunderclap missiles out from the city walls. The enemy cavalry was terrified and ran away." The Jin were forced to retreat and make camp by the riverside. In a rare occurrence, the Song made a successful offensive on Jin forces and conducted a night assault using boats. They were loaded with gunpowder arrows, thunderclap bombs, a thousand crossbowmen, five hundred infantry, and a hundred drummers. Jin troops were surprised in their encampment while asleep by loud drumming, followed by an onslaught of crossbow bolts, and then thunderclap bombs, which caused a panic of such magnitude that they were unable to even saddle themselves and trampled over each other trying to get away. Two to three thousand Jin troops were slaughtered along with eight to nine hundred horses.

== Competing with gunpowder empires ==
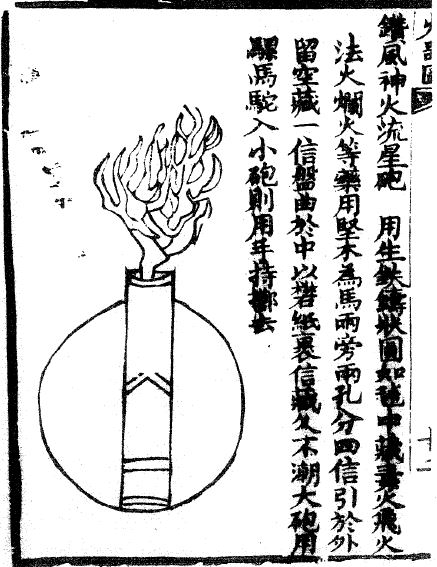
A 'magic fire meteor going against the wind' bomb as depicted in the Huolongjing.

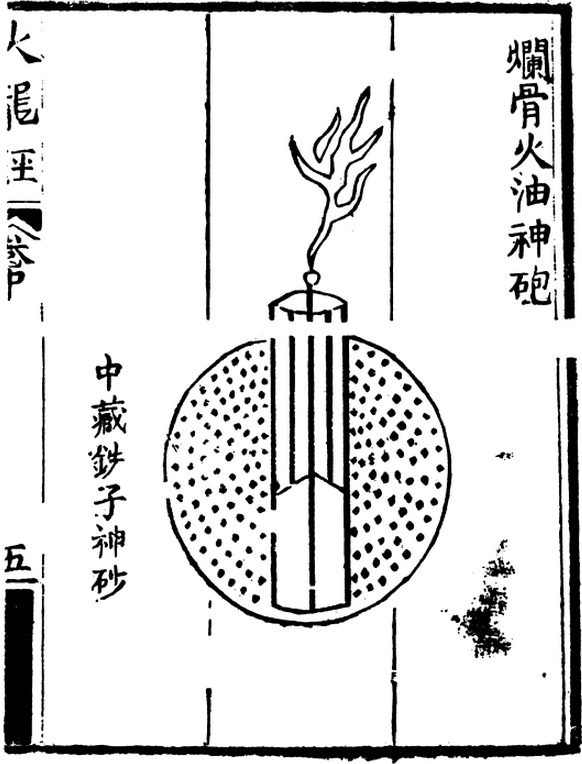
A 'bone-burning and bruising fire-oil magic bomb' (lan gu huo you shen pao 爛骨火油神砲) fragmentation bomb from the Huolongjing. It is composed of a cast iron casing, iron pellets coated in tung oil, urine, sal ammoniac, feces, and scallion juice. In the middle is a gunpowder stick.

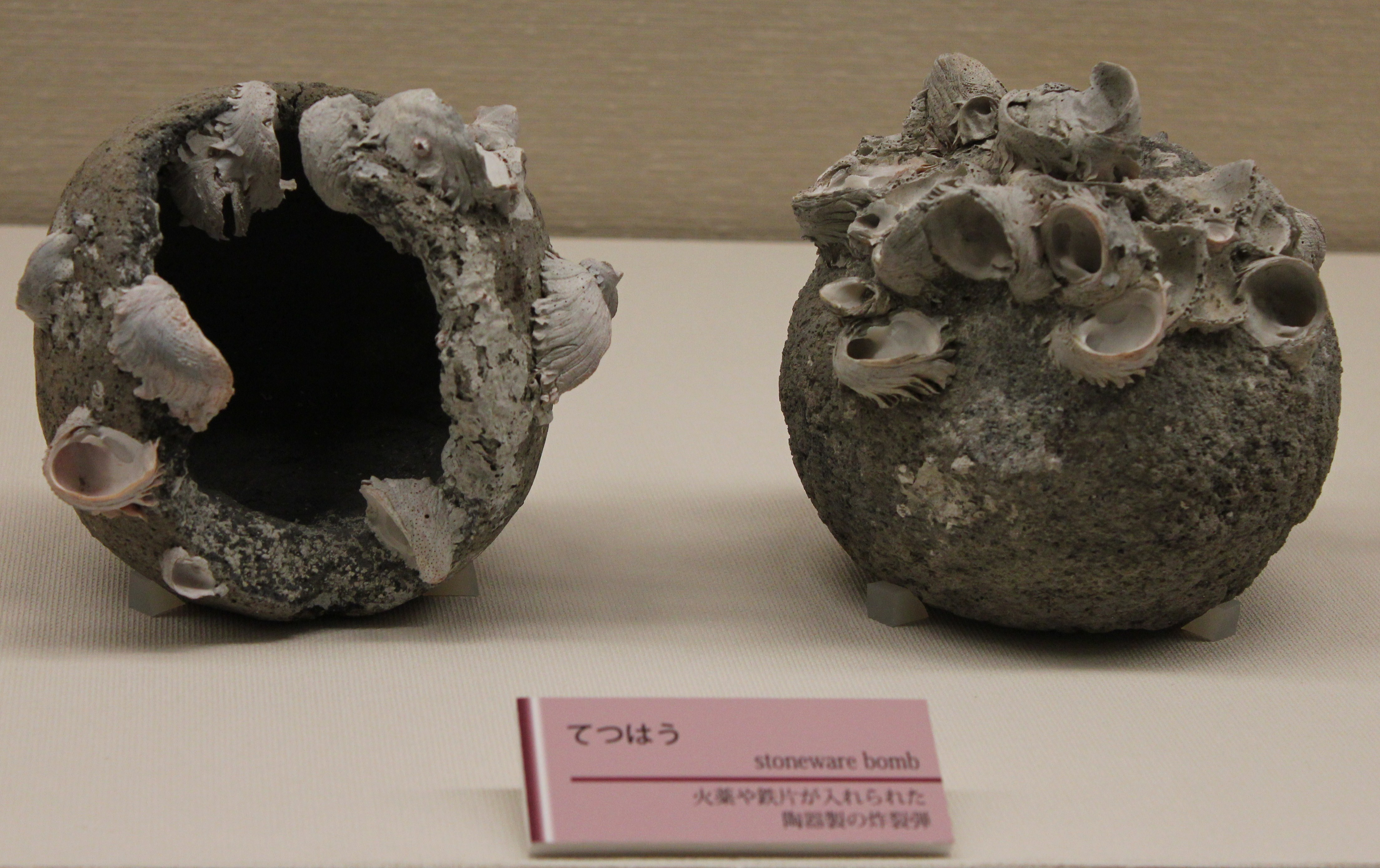
Stoneware bombs, known in Japanese as Tetsuhau (iron bomb), or in Chinese as Zhentianlei (thunder crash bomb), excavated from the Takashima shipwreck, October 2011, dated to the Mongol invasions of Japan (1271–1284 AD).

=== Hard-shell explosives ===
Traditionally the inspiration for the development of the iron bomb is ascribed to the tale of a fox hunter named Iron Li. According to the story, around the year 1189 Iron Li developed a new method for hunting foxes which used a ceramic explosive to scare foxes into his nets. The explosive consisted of a ceramic bottle with a mouth, stuffed with gunpowder, and attached with a fuse. Explosive and net were placed at strategic points of places such as watering holes frequented by foxes, and when they got near enough, Iron Li would light the fuse, causing the ceramic bottle to explode and scaring the frightened foxes right into his nets. Although the veracity of this story is uncertain, the tradition holds that this ceramic bomb inspired the Jin to create an iron version.

The invention of hard shell explosives did not occur in the Song dynasty. Instead it was introduced to them by the northern Jurchen Jin dynasty in 1221 during the siege of Qizhou (in modern Hubei province). The Song commander Zhao Yurong (趙與褣) survived and was able to relay his account for posterity.

Qizhou was a major fortress city situated near the Yangtze and a 25 thousand strong Jin army advanced on it in 1221. News of the approaching army reached Zhao Yurong in Qizhou, and despite being outnumbered nearly eight to one, he decided to hold the city. Qizhou's arsenal consisted of some three thousand thunderclap bombs, twenty thousand "great leather bombs" (皮大炮), and thousands of gunpowder arrows and gunpowder crossbow bolts. While the formula for gunpowder had become potent enough to consider the Song bombs to be true explosives, they were unable to match the explosive power of the Jin iron bombs. Yurong describes the uneven exchange thus, "The barbaric enemy attacked the Northwest Tower with an unceasing flow of catapult projectiles from thirteen catapults. Each catapult shot was followed by an iron fire bomb [catapult shot], whose sound was like thunder. That day, the city soldiers in facing the catapult shots showed great courage as they maneuvered [our own] catapults, hindered by injuries from the iron fire bombs. Their heads, their eyes, their cheeks were exploded to bits, and only one half [of the face] was left." Jin artillerists were able to successfully target the command center itself: "The enemy fired off catapult stones ... nonstop day and night, and the magistrate's headquarters [帳] at the eastern gate, as well as my own quarters ..., were hit by the most iron fire bombs, to the point that they struck even on top of [my] sleeping quarters and [I] nearly perished! Some said there was a traitor. If not, how would they have known the way to strike at both of these places?" Zhao was able to examine the new iron bombs himself and described thus, "In shape they are like gourds, but with a small mouth. They are made with pig iron, about two inches thick, and they cause the city's walls to shake." Houses were blown apart, towers battered, and defenders blasted from their placements. Within four weeks all four gates were under heavy bombardment. Finally the Jin made a frontal assault on the walls and scaled them, after which followed a merciless hunt for soldiers, officers, and officials of every level. Zhao managed an escape by clambering over the battlement and making a hasty retreat across the river, but his family remained in the city. Upon returning at a later date to search the ruins, he found that the "bones and skeletons were so mixed up that there was no way to tell who was who."

=== Eruptors and cannons ===
The early fire lance, considered to be the ancestor of firearms, is not considered a true gun because it did not include projectiles. Later on, shrapnel such as ceramics and bits of iron were added, but these didn't occlude the barrel, and were only swept along with the discharge rather than make use of windage. These projectiles were called "co-viatives." The commonplace nature of the fire lance, if not in quantity, was apparent by the mid-13th century, and in 1257 an arsenal in Jiankang Prefecture reported the manufacture of 333 "fire emitting tubes" (突火筒). In 1259 a type of "fire-emitting lance" (突火槍) made an appearance and according to the History of Song: "It is made from a large bamboo tube, and inside is stuffed a pellet wad (子窠). Once the fire goes off it completely spews the rear pellet wad forth, and the sound is like a bomb that can be heard for five hundred or more paces." The pellet wad mentioned is possibly the first true bullet in recorded history depending on how bullet is defined, as it did occlude the barrel, unlike previous co-viatives used in the fire lance.

Fire lances transformed from the "bamboo- (or wood- or paper-) barreled firearm to the metal-barreled firearm" to better withstand the explosive pressure of gunpowder. From there it branched off into several different gunpowder weapons known as "eruptors" in the late 12th and early 13th centuries, with different functions such as the "filling-the-sky erupting tube" which spewed out poisonous gas and porcelain shards, the "orifice-penetrating flying sand magic mist tube" (鑽穴飛砂神霧筒) which spewed forth sand and poisonous chemicals into orifices, and the more conventional "phalanx-charging fire gourd" which shot out lead pellets. The character for lance, or spear (槍), has continued to refer to both the melee weapon and the firearm into modern China, perhaps as a reminder of its original form as simply a tube of gunpowder tied to a spear.

Traditionally the first appearance of the hand cannon is dated to the late 13th century, just after the Mongol conquest of the Song dynasty. However a sculpture depicting a figure carrying a gourd shaped hand cannon was discovered among the Dazu Rock Carvings in 1985 by Robin D. S. Yates. The sculptures were completed roughly 250 km northwest of Chongqing by 1128, after the fall of Kaifeng to the Jin dynasty. If the dating is correct this would push back the appearance of the cannon in China by a hundred years more than previously thought. The bulbous nature of the cannon is congruous with the earliest hand cannons discovered in China and Europe.

Archaeological samples of the gun, specifically the hand cannon (huochong), have been dated starting from the 13th century. The oldest extant gun whose dating is unequivocal is the Xanadu Gun, so called because it was discovered in the ruins of Xanadu, the Mongol summer palace in Inner Mongolia. The Xanadu Gun is 34.7 cm in length and weighs 6.2 kg. Its dating is based on archaeological context and a straightforward inscription whose era name and year corresponds with the Gregorian Calendar at 1298. Not only does the inscription contain the era name and date, it also includes a serial number and manufacturing information which suggests that gun production had already become systematized, or at least become a somewhat standardized affair by the time of its fabrication. The design of the gun includes axial holes in its rear which some speculate could have been used in a mounting mechanism. Like most early guns with the possible exception of the Western Xia gun, it is small, weighing just over six kilograms and thirty-five centimeters in length. Although the Xanadu Gun is the most precisely dated gun from the 13th century, other extant samples with approximate dating likely predate it.

One candidate is the Heilongjiang hand cannon, discovered in 1970, and named after the province of its discovery, Heilongjiang, in northeastern China. It is small and light like the Xanadu gun, weighing only 3.5 kilograms, 34 cm (Needham says 35 cm), and a bore of approximately 2.5 cm. Based on contextual evidence, historians believe it was used by Yuan forces against a rebellion by Mongol prince Nayan in 1287. The History of Yuan states that a Jurchen commander known as Li Ting led troops armed with hand cannons into battle against Nayan.

The Ningxia gun was found in Ningxia Hui Autonomous Region by collector Meng Jianmin (孟建民). This Yuan dynasty firearm is 34.6 cm long, the muzzle 2.6 cm in diameter, and weighs 1.55 kilograms. The firearm contains a transcription reading, "Made by bronzesmith Li Liujing in the year Zhiyuan 8 (直元), ningzi number 2565" (銅匠作頭李六徑，直元捌年造，寧字二仟伍百陸拾伍號). Similar to the Xanadu Gun, it bears a serial number 2565, which suggests it may have been part of a series of guns manufactured. While the era name and date corresponds with the Gregorian Calendar at 1271 CE, putting it earlier than both the Heilongjiang Hand Gun as well as the Xanadu Gun, but one of the characters used in the era name is irregular, causing some doubt among scholars on the exact date of production.

Another specimen, the Wuwei Bronze Cannon, was discovered in 1980 and may possibly be the oldest as well as largest cannon of the 13th century: a 100 centimeter 108 kilogram bronze cannon discovered in a cellar in Wuwei, Gansu Province containing no inscription, but has been dated by historians to the late Western Xia period between 1214 and 1227. The gun contained an iron ball about nine centimeters in diameter, which is smaller than the muzzle diameter at twelve centimeters, and 0.1 kilograms of gunpowder in it when discovered, meaning that the projectile might have been another co-viative. Ben Sinvany and Dang Shoushan believe that the ball used to be much larger prior to its highly corroded state at the time of discovery. While large in size, the weapon is noticeably more primitive than later Yuan dynasty guns, and is unevenly cast. A similar weapon was discovered not far from the discovery site in 1997, but much smaller in size at only 1.5 kg. Chen Bingying disputes this however, and argues there were no guns before 1259, while Dang Shoushan believes the Western Xia guns point to the appearance of guns by 1220, and Stephen Haw goes even further by stating that guns were developed as early as 1200. Sinologist Joseph Needham and renaissance siege expert Thomas Arnold provide a more conservative estimate of around 1280 for the appearance of the "true" cannon. Whether or not any of these are correct, it seems likely that the gun was born sometime during the 13th century.

=== Late Song gunpowder weaponry ===
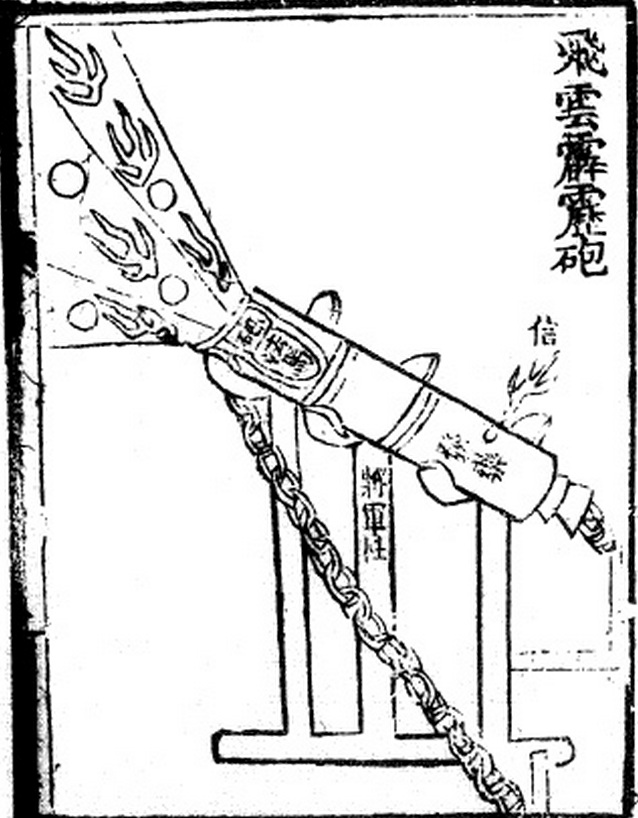
An illustration of a 'flying-cloud thunderclap-eruptor,' a cannon firing thunderclap bombs, from the Huolongjing.

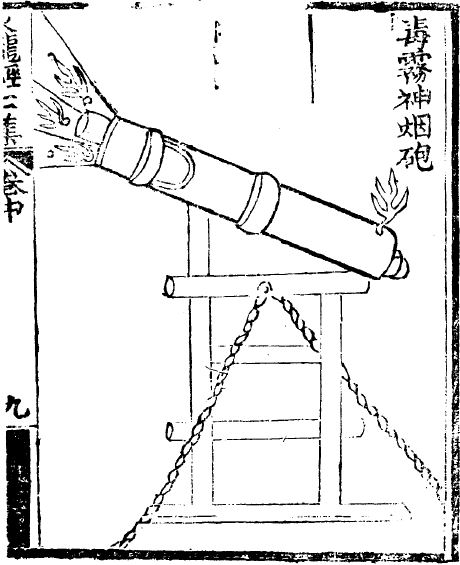
A 'poison fog divine smoke eruptor' (du wu shen yan pao) as depicted in the Huolongjing. Small shells emitting poisonous smoke are fired.

By the mid-13th century, gunpowder weapons were available to both the Mongols and the Song. The Mongol war machine moved south and in 1237 attacked the Song city of Anfeng (modern Shouxian, Anhui Province) "using gunpowder bombs [huo pao] to burn the [defensive] towers." These bombs were apparently quite large. "Several hundred men hurled one bomb, and if it hit the tower it would immediately smash it to pieces." The Song defenders under commander Du Gao (杜杲) rebuilt the towers and retaliated with their own bombs, which they called the "Elipao," after a famous local pear, probably in reference to the shape of the weapon. Perhaps as another point of military interest, the account of this battle also mentions that the Anfeng defenders were equipped with a type of small arrow to shoot through eye slits of Mongol armor, as normal arrows were too thick to penetrate.

In 1257 the Song official Li Zengbo was dispatched to inspect frontier city arsenals. Li considered an ideal city arsenal to include several hundred thousand iron bombshells, and also its own production facility to produce at least a couple thousand a month. The results of his tour of the border were severely disappointing and in one arsenal he found "no more than 85 iron bomb-shells, large and small, 95 fire-arrows, and 105 fire-lances. This is not sufficient for a mere hundred men, let alone a thousand, to use against an attack by the ... barbarians. The government supposedly wants to make preparations for the defense of its fortified cities, and to furnish them with military supplies against the enemy (yet this is all they give us). What chilling indifference!" Fortunately for the Song, Möngke Khan died in 1259 and the war would not continue until 1269 under the leadership of Kublai Khan, but when it did the Mongols came in full force.

Blocking the Mongols' passage south of the Yangtze were the twin fortress cities of Xiangyang and Fancheng. What resulted was one of the longest sieges the world had ever known, lasting from 1268 to 1273. For the first three years the Song defenders had been able to receive supplies and reinforcements by water, but in 1271 the Mongols set up a full blockade with a formidable navy of their own, isolating the two cities. This didn't prevent the Song from running the supply route anyway, and two men with the surname Zhang did exactly that. The Two Zhangs commanded a hundred paddle wheel boats, travelling by night under the light of lantern fire, but were discovered early on by a Mongol commander. When the Song fleet arrived near the cities, they found the Mongol fleet to have spread themselves out along the entire width of the Yangtze with "vessels spread out, filling the entire surface of the river, and there was no gap for them to enter." Another defensive measure the Mongols had taken was the construction of a chain, which stretched across the water. The two fleets engaged in combat and the Song opened fire with fire-lances, fire-bombs, and crossbows. A large number of men died trying to cut through chains, pull up stakes, and hurl bombs, while Song marines fought hand to hand using large axes, and according to the Mongol record, "on their ships they were up to the ankles in blood." With the rise of dawn, the Song vessels made it to the city walls and the citizens "leapt up a hundred times in joy." In 1273 the Mongols enlisted the expertise of two Muslim engineers, one from Persia and one from Syria, who helped in the construction of counterweight trebuchets. These new siege weapons had the capability of throwing larger missiles further than the previous traction trebuchets. One account records, "when the machinery went off the noise shook heaven and earth; every thing that [the missile] hit was broken and destroyed." The fortress city of Xiangyang fell in 1273.

The next major battle to feature gunpowder weapons was during a campaign led by the Mongol general Bayan, who commanded an army of around two hundred thousand, consisting of mostly Chinese soldiers. It was probably the largest army the Mongols had ever utilized. Such an army was still unable to successfully storm Song city walls, as seen in the 1274 Siege of Shayang. Thus Bayan waited for the wind to change to a northerly course before ordering his artillerists to begin bombarding the city with molten metal bombs, which caused such a fire that "the buildings were burned up and the smoke and flames rose up to heaven." Shayang was captured and its inhabitants massacred.

Gunpowder bombs were used again in the 1275 Siege of Changzhou in the latter stages of the Mongol-Song Wars. Upon arriving at the city, Bayan gave the inhabitants an ultimatum: "if you ... resist us ... we shall drain your carcasses of blood and use them for pillows." This didn't work and the city resisted anyway, so the Mongol army bombarded them with fire bombs before storming the walls, after which followed an immense slaughter claiming the lives of a quarter million. The war lasted for only another four years during which some remnants of the Song held up last desperate defenses. In 1277, 250 defenders under Lou Qianxia conducted a suicide bombing and set off a huge iron bomb when it became clear defeat was imminent. Of this, the History of Song writes, "the noise was like a tremendous thunderclap, shaking the walls and ground, and the smoke filled up the heavens outside. Many of the troops [outside] were startled to death. When the fire was extinguished they went in to see. There were just ashes, not a trace left." So came an end to the Mongol-Song Wars, which saw the deployment of all the gunpowder weapons available to both sides at the time, which for the most part meant gunpowder arrows, bombs, and lances, but in retrospect, another development would overshadow them all, the birth of the gun.

== Flags ==
=== Wujing Zongyao ===
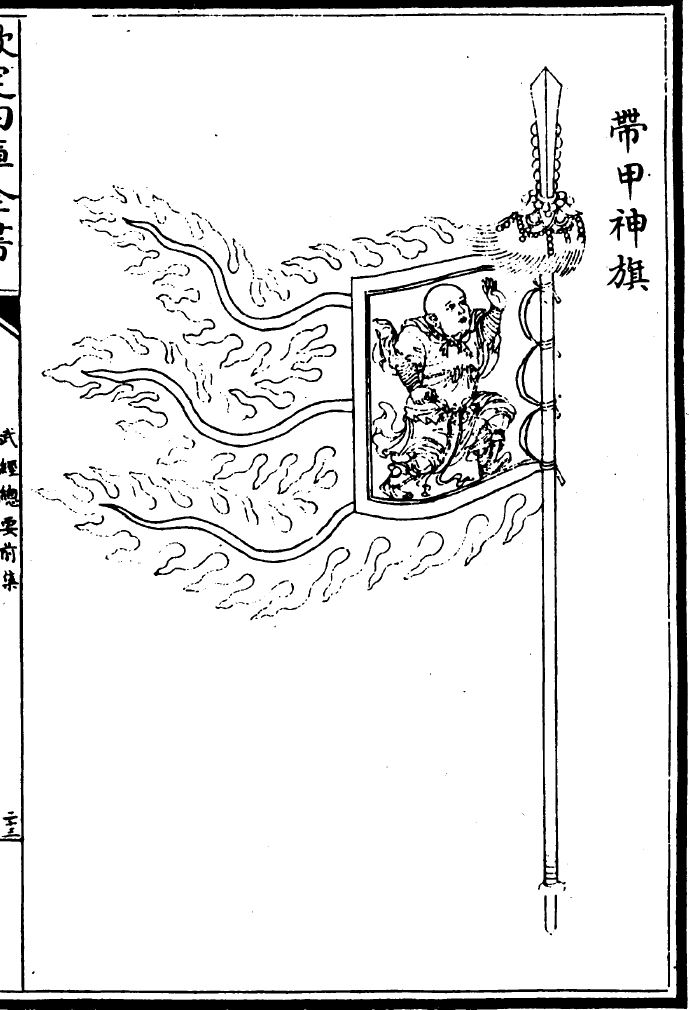

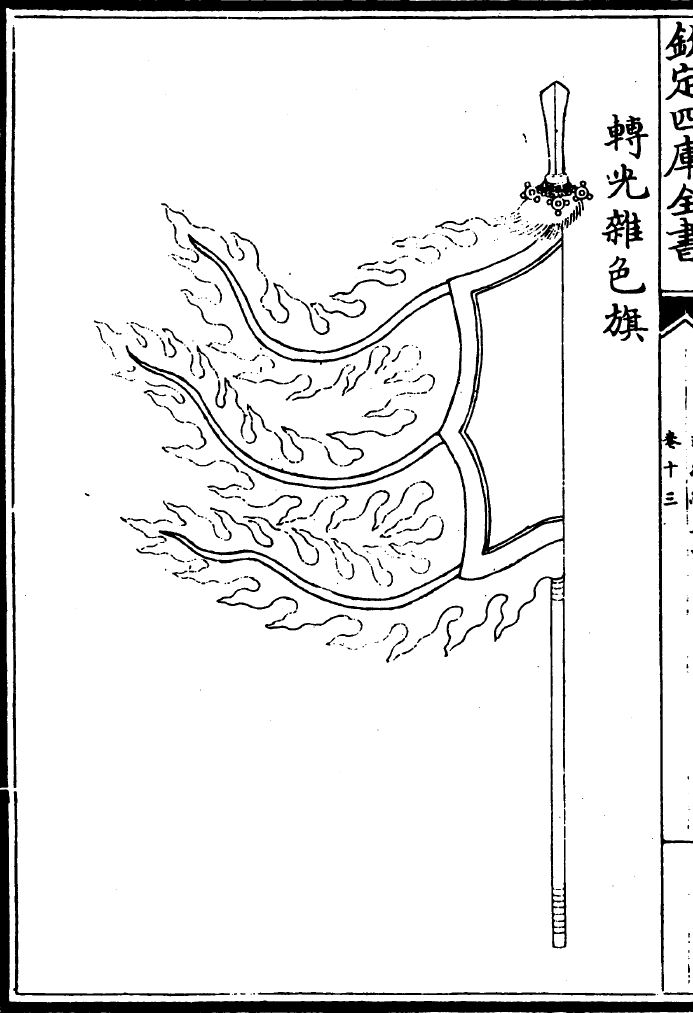

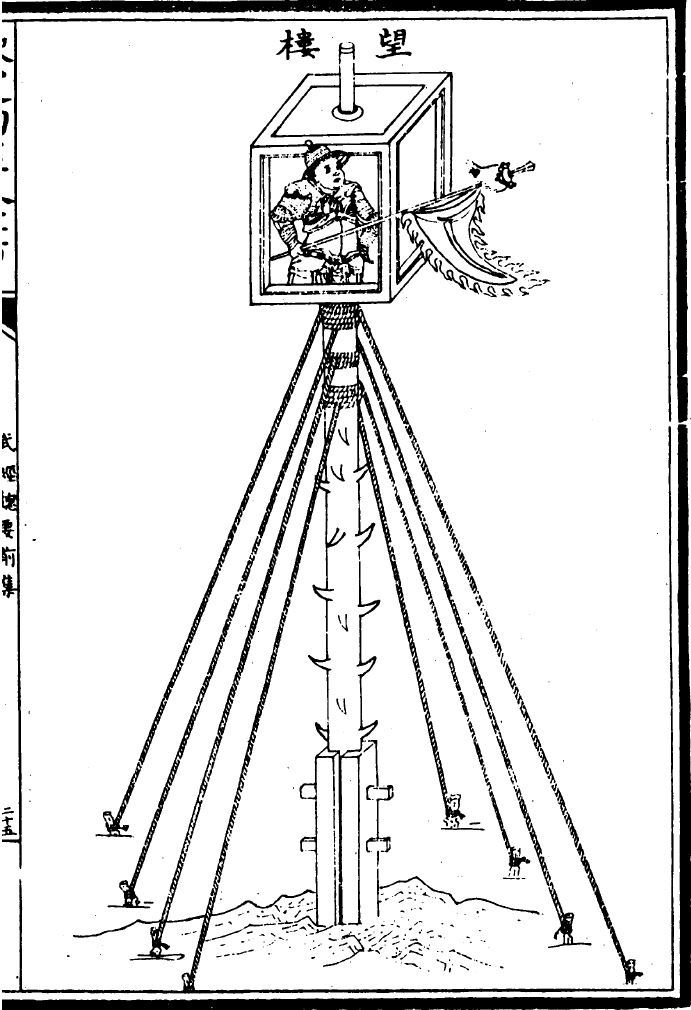

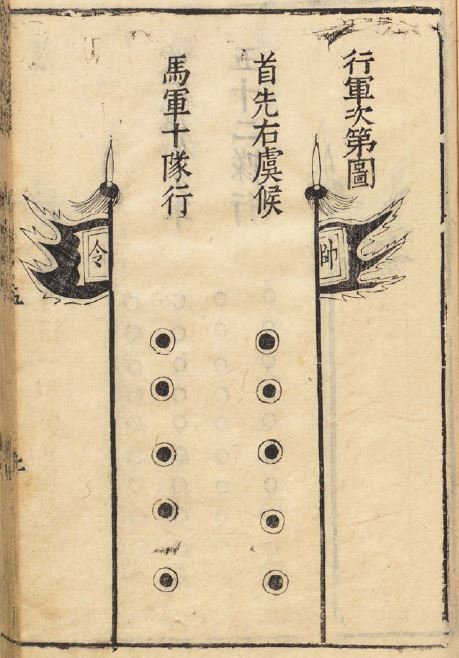

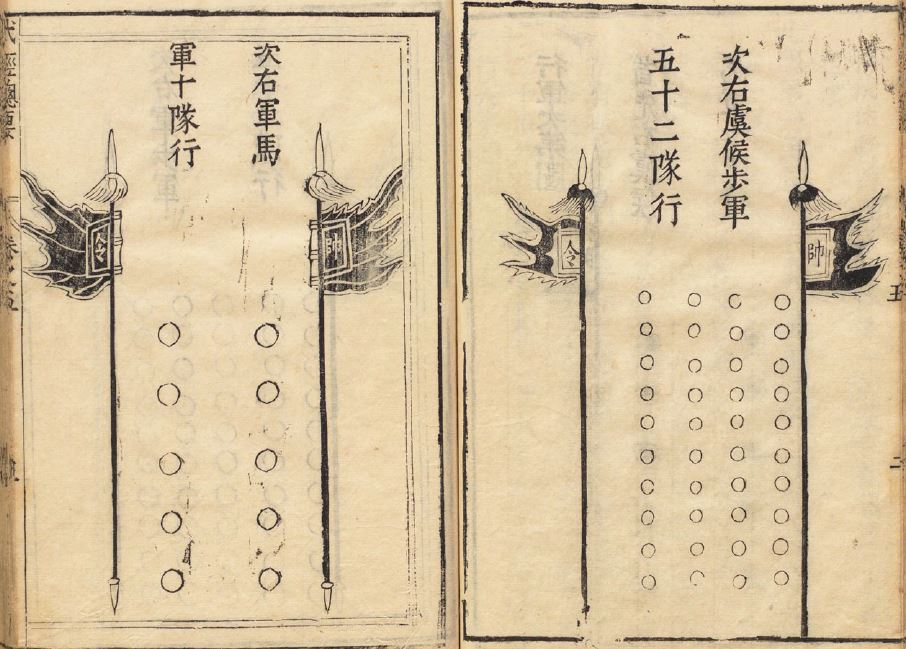

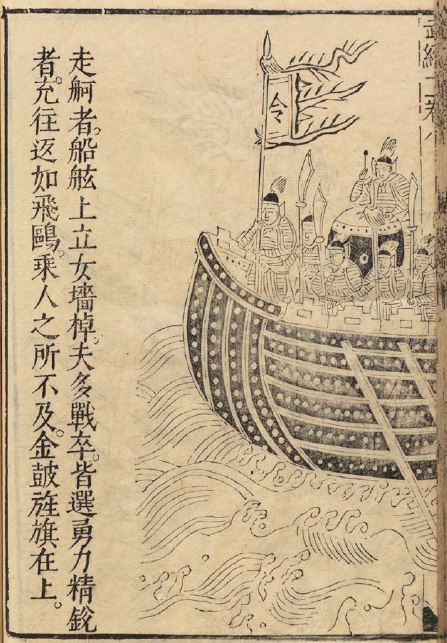

=== Paintings ===
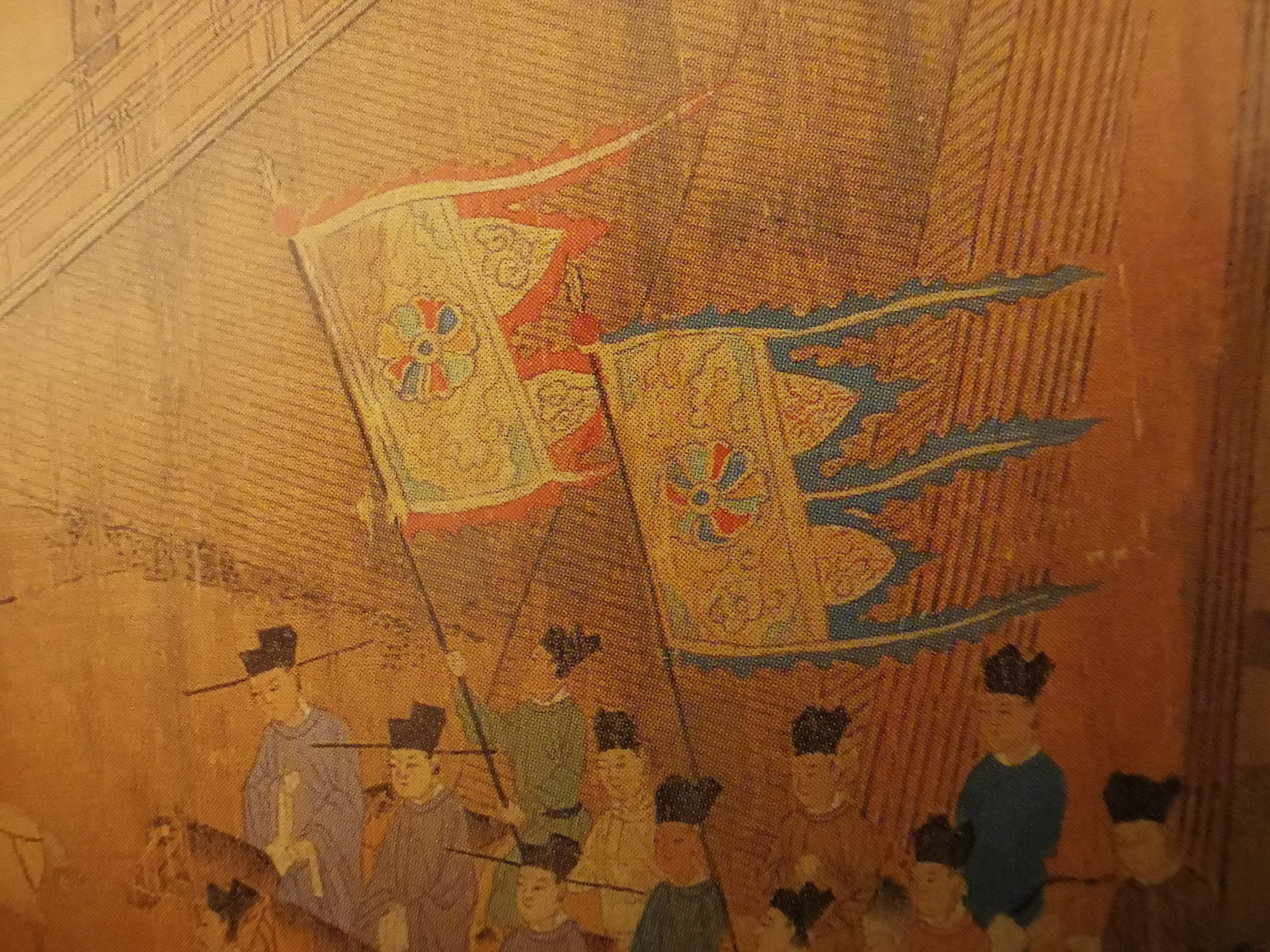

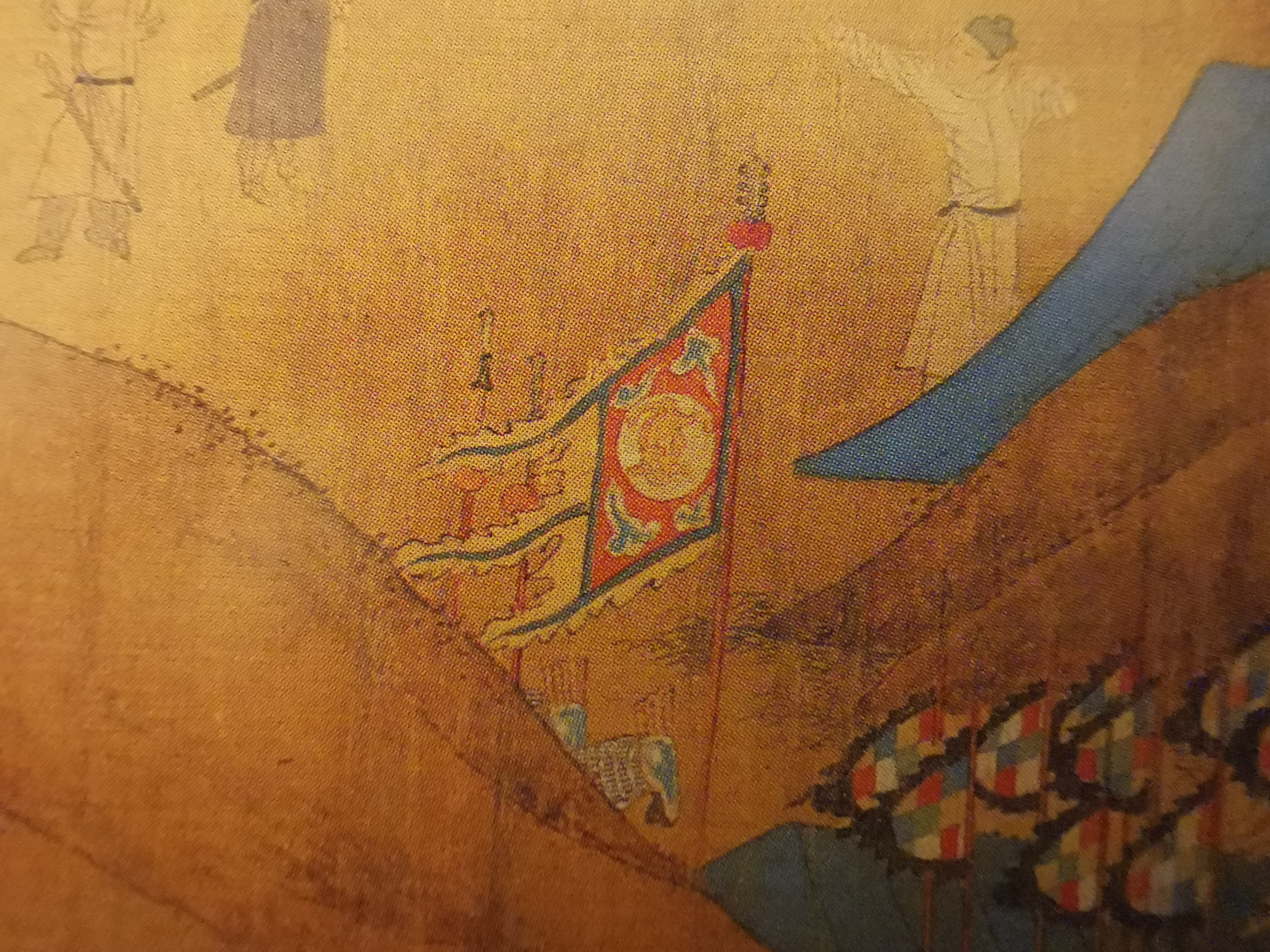

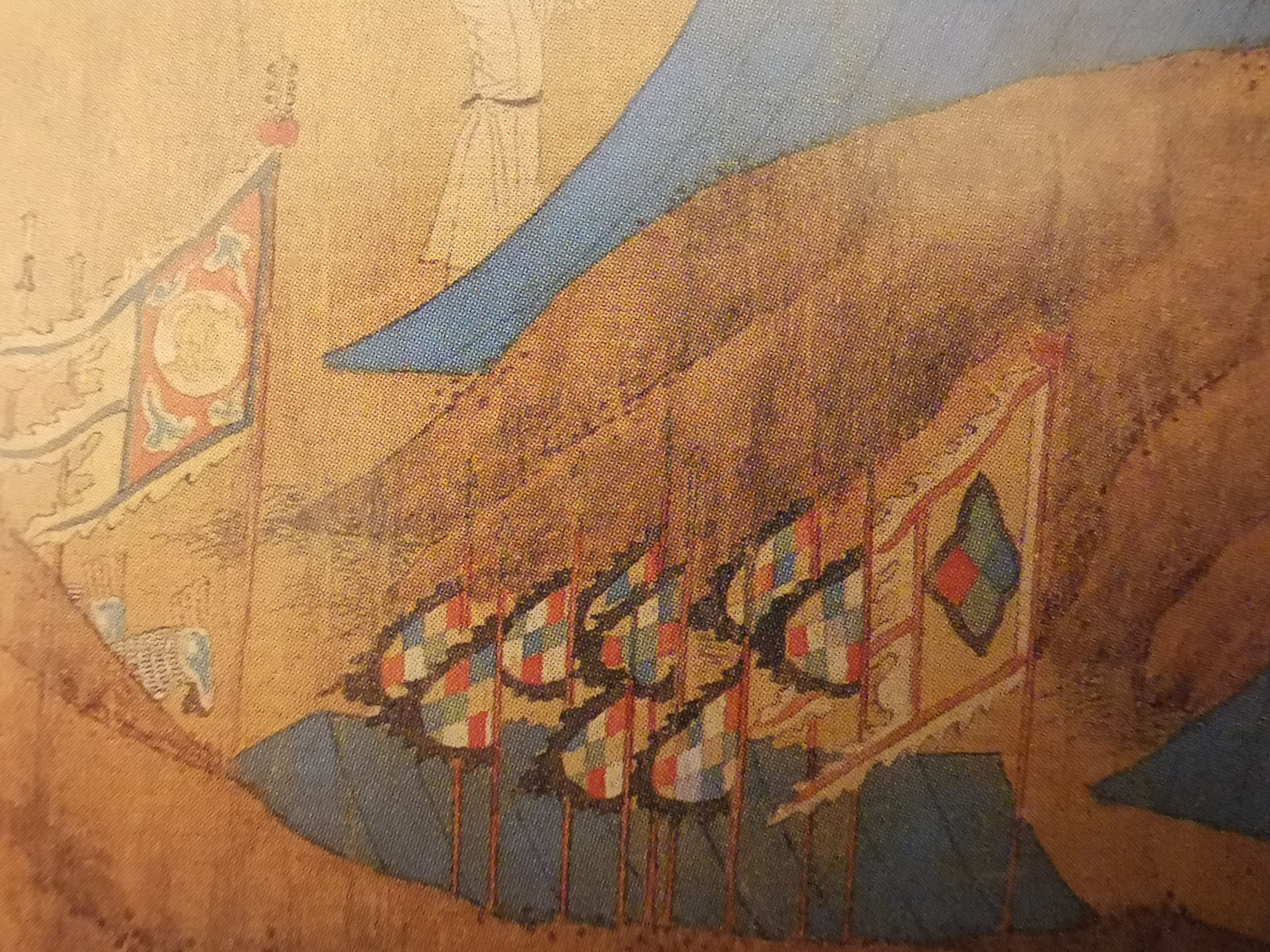

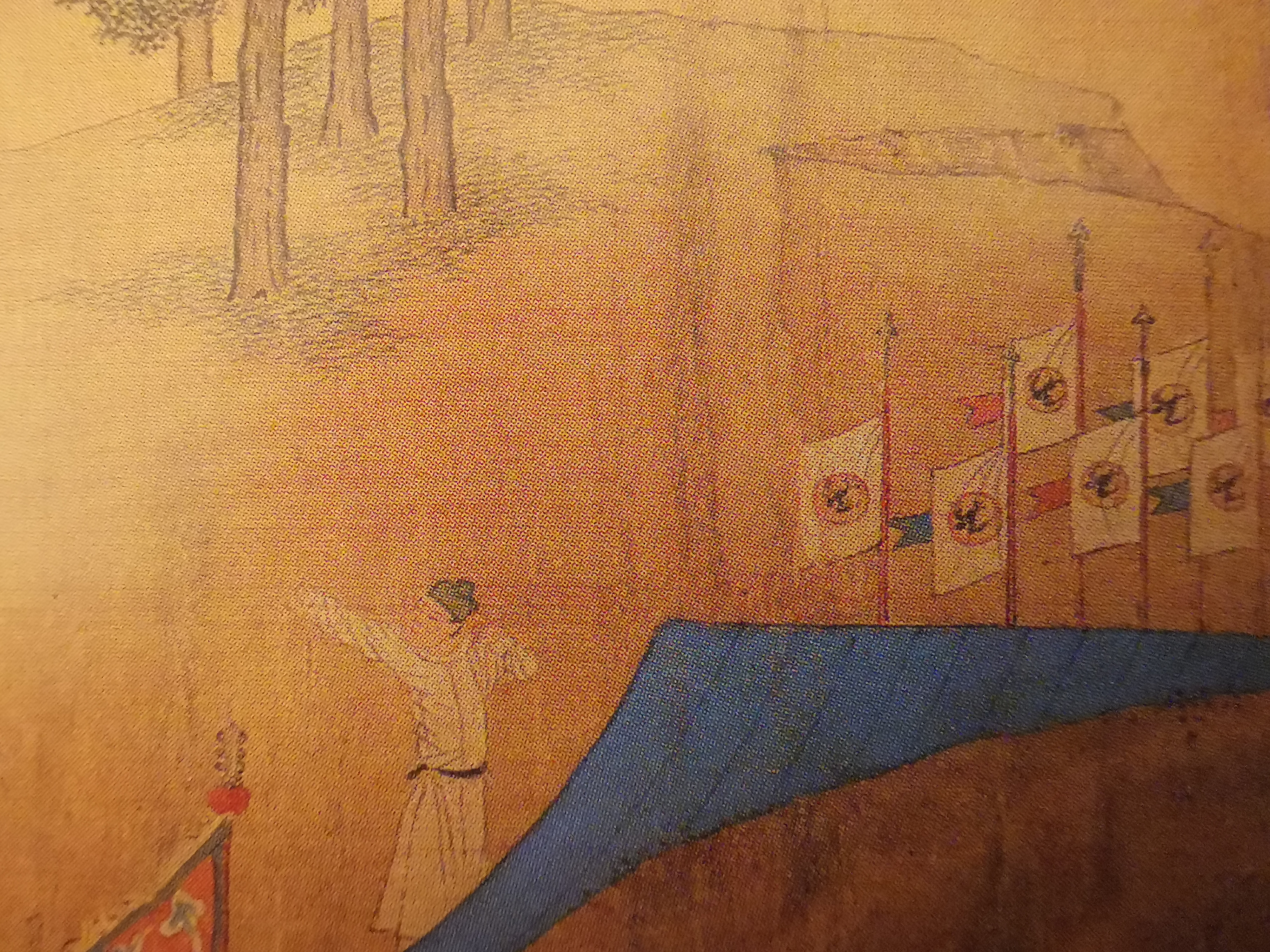

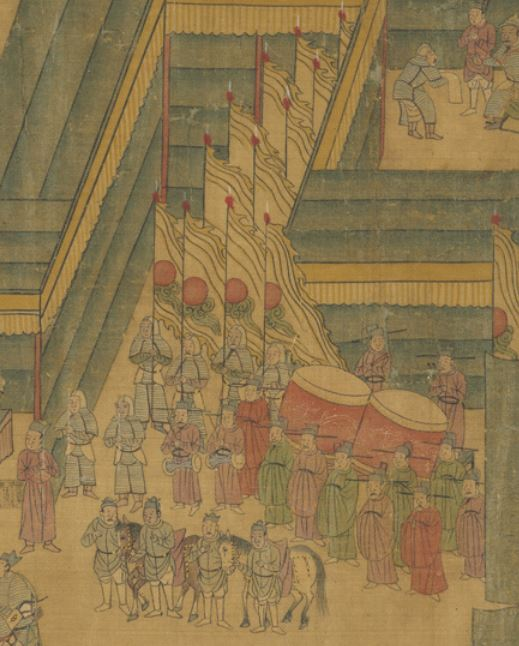

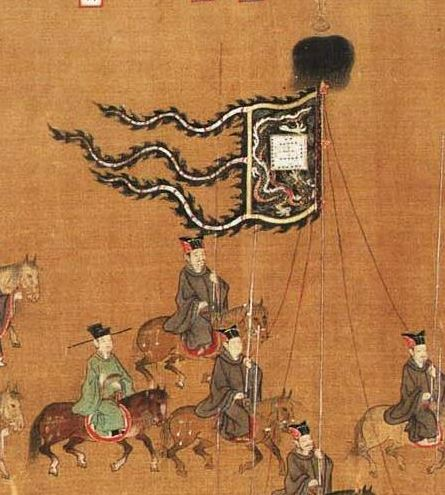

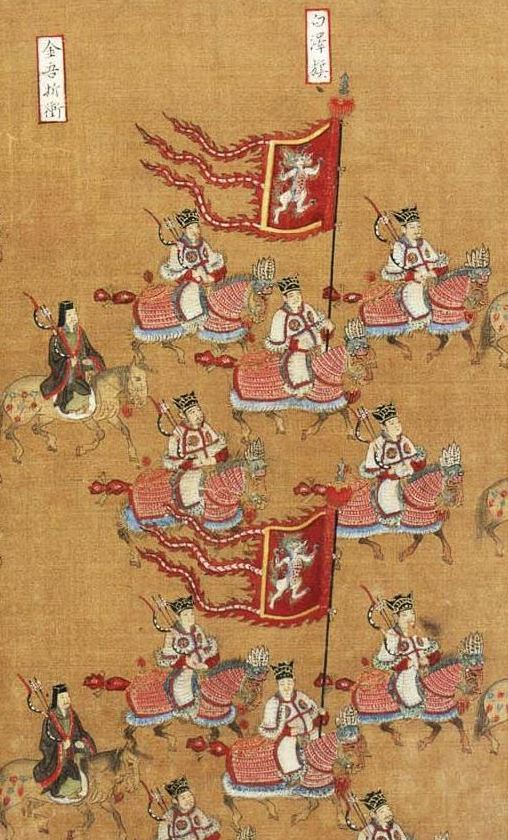

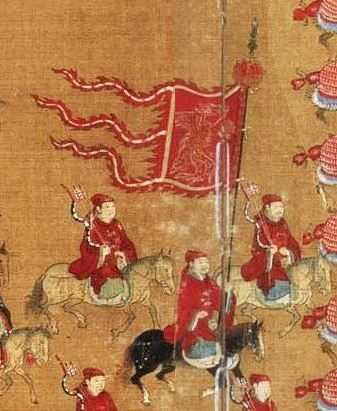

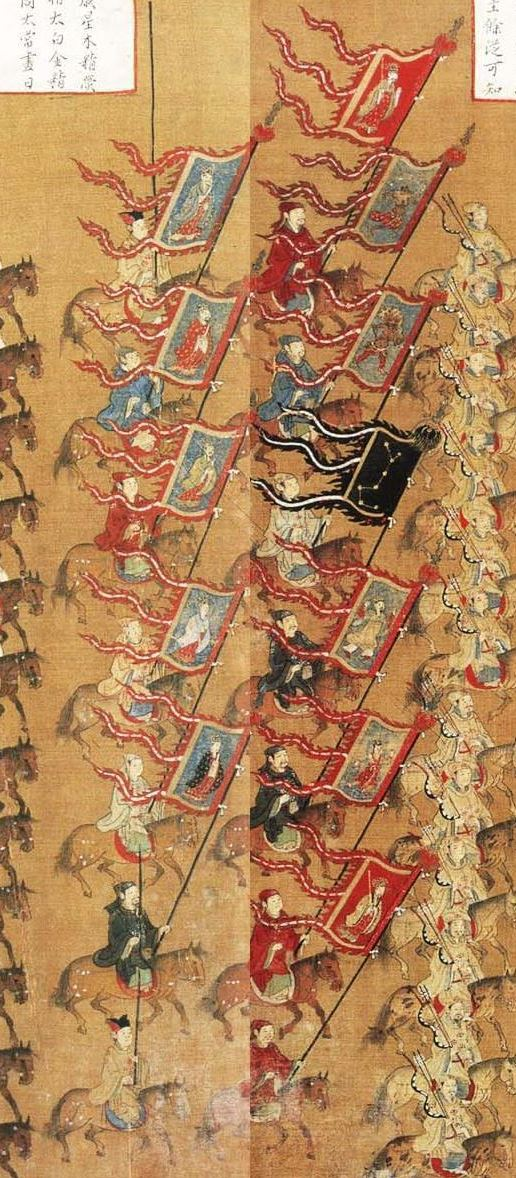

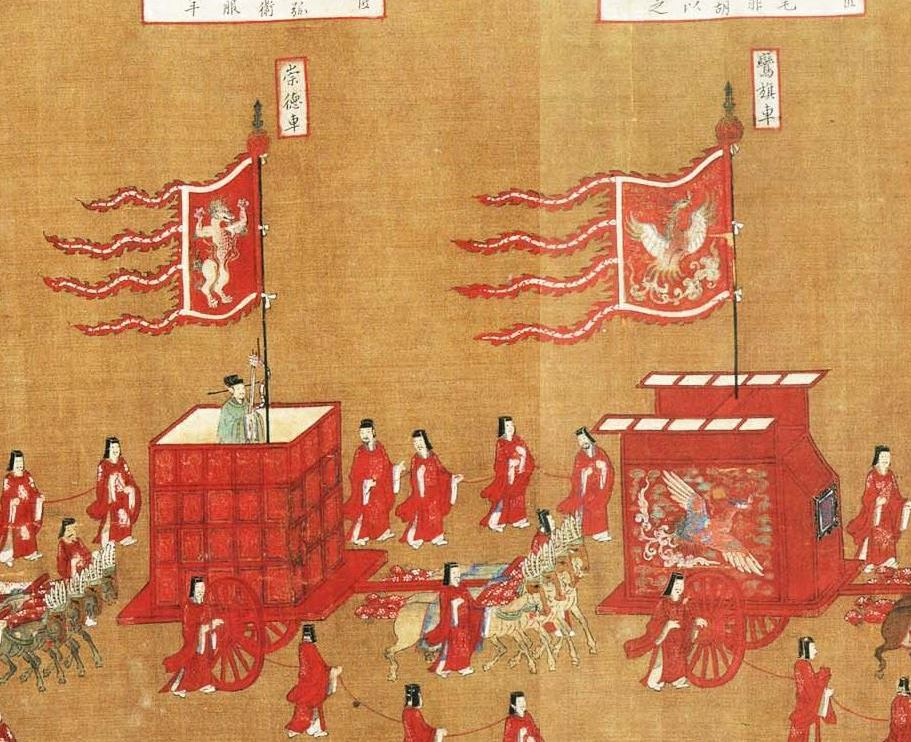

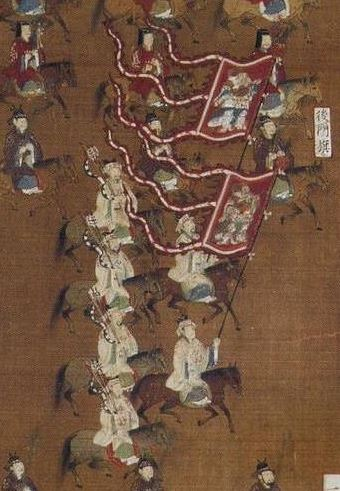

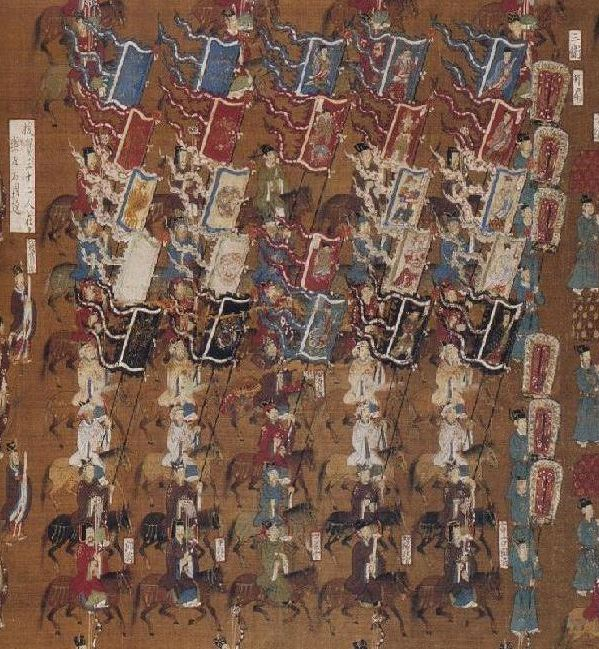

== Bibliography ==
- Andrade, Tonio (2016), The Gunpowder Age: China, Military Innovation, and the Rise of the West in World History, Princeton University Press, ISBN 978-0-691-13597-7.
- Arnold, Thomas (2001), The Renaissance at War, Cassell & Co, ISBN 978-0-304-35270-8
- Asimov, M.S. (1998), History of civilizations of Central Asia Volume IV The age of achievement: A.D. 750 to the end of the fifteenth century Part One The historical, social and economic setting, UNESCO Publishing
- Barfield, Thomas (1989), The Perilous Frontier: Nomadic Empires and China, Basil Blackwell
- Barrett, Timothy Hugh (2008), The Woman Who Discovered Printing, Great Britain: Yale University Press, ISBN 978-0-300-12728-7 (alk. paper)
- Beckwith, Christopher I (1987), The Tibetan Empire in Central Asia: A History of the Struggle for Great Power among Tibetans, Turks, Arabs, and Chinese during the Early Middle Ages, Princeton University Press
- Beckwith, Christopher I. (2009), Empires of the Silk Road: A History of Central Eurasia from the Bronze Age to the Present, Princeton University Press, ISBN 978-0-691-13589-2
- Biran, Michal (2005), The Empire of the Qara Khitai in Eurasian History: Between China and the Islamic World, Cambridge Studies in Islamic Civilization, Cambridge, England: Cambridge University Press, ISBN 0521842263
- Bregel, Yuri (2003), An Historical Atlas of Central Asia, Brill
- Chase, Kenneth Warren (2003), Firearms: A Global History to 1700, Cambridge University Press, ISBN 978-0-521-82274-9
- Chaffee, John W. (2015), The Cambridge History of China Volume 5 Part Two Sung China, 960-1279, Cambridge University Press
- Chia, Lucille (2011), Knowledge and Text Production in an Age of Print: China, 900-1400, Brill
- Drompp, Michael Robert (2005), Tang China And The Collapse Of The Uighur Empire: A Documentary History, Brill
- Ebrey, Patricia Buckley (1999), The Cambridge Illustrated History of China, Cambridge: Cambridge University Press, ISBN 0-521-66991-X (paperback).
- Ebrey, Patricia Buckley; Walthall, Anne; Palais, James B. (2006), East Asia: A Cultural, Social, and Political History, Boston: Houghton Mifflin, ISBN 0-618-13384-4
- Gibb, H.A.R (1994), The Travels of Ibn Battuta
- Golden, Peter B. (1992), An Introduction to the History of the Turkic Peoples: Ethnogenesis and State-Formation in Medieval and Early Modern Eurasia and the Middle East, OTTO HARRASSOWITZ · WIESBADEN
- Gernet, Jacques (1962). Daily Life in China on the Eve of the Mongol Invasion, 1250–1276. Translated by H.M. Wright. Stanford: Stanford University Press. ISBN 0-8047-0720-0
- Graff, David A. (2002), Medieval Chinese Warfare, 300-900, Warfare and History, London: Routledge, ISBN 0415239559
- Graff, David Andrew (2016), The Eurasian Way of War Military Practice in Seventh-Century China and Byzantium, Routledge, ISBN 978-0-415-46034-7.
- Graff, David Andrew and Robin Higham (2002). A Military History of China. Boulder: Westview Press.
- Haywood, John (1998), Historical Atlas of the Medieval World, AD 600-1492, Barnes & Noble
- Hartman, Charles (2021), The Making of Song Dynasty History
- Herman, John E. (2007), Amid the Clouds and Mist China's Colonization of Guizhou, 1200–1700, Harvard University Asia Center, ISBN 978-0-674-02591-2
- Kelly, Jack (2004), Gunpowder: Alchemy, Bombards, & Pyrotechnics: The History of the Explosive that Changed the World, Basic Books, ISBN 0-465-03718-6.
- Knapp, Ronald G. (2008), Chinese Bridges: Living Architecture From China's Past. Singapore, Tuttle Publishing
- Kuhn, Dieter (2009), The Age of Confucian Rule, Harvard University Press
- Latourette, Kenneth Scott (1964), The Chinese, their history and culture, Volumes 1-2, Macmillan
- Liang, Jieming (2006), Chinese Siege Warfare: Mechanical Artillery & Siege Weapons of Antiquity, Singapore, Republic of Singapore: Leong Kit Meng, ISBN 981-05-5380-3
- Lorge, Peter (2005), War, Politics and Society in Early Modern China, 900–1795, Routledge, ISBN 978-0-203-96929-8
- Lo, Jung-pang (2012), China as a Sea Power 1127-1368
- Lorge, Peter A. (2008), The Asian Military Revolution: from Gunpowder to the Bomb, Cambridge University Press, ISBN 978-0-521-60954-8
- Lorge, Peter A. (2015), The Reunification of China
- Lu, Gwei-Djen (1988), "The Oldest Representation of a Bombard", Technology and Culture, 29 (3): 594–605, doi:10.2307/3105275, JSTOR 3105275
- Luttwak, Edward N. (2009), The Grand Strategy of the Byzantine Empire, The Belknap Press of Harvard University Press
- Millward, James (2009), Eurasian Crossroads: A History of Xinjiang, Columbia University Press
- Mote, F. W. (2003), Imperial China: 900–1800, Harvard University Press, ISBN 978-0674012127
- Needham, Joseph (1986a), Science and Civilization in China: Volume 3, Mathematics and the Sciences of the Heavens and the Earth, Taipei: Caves Books
- —— (1986g), Science and Civilization in China: Volume 4, Physics and Physical Engineering, Part 1, Physics, Taipei: Caves Books
- —— (1986b), Science and Civilization in China: Volume 4, Physics and Physical Engineering, Part 2, Mechanical Engineering, Taipei: Caves Books
- —— (1986c), Science and Civilization in China: Volume 4, Physics and Physical Technology, Part 3, Civil Engineering and Nautics, Taipei: Caves Books
- —— (1986d), Science and Civilization in China: Volume 5, Chemistry and Chemical Technology, Part 1, Paper and Printing, Taipei: Caves Books
- —— (1986e), Science and Civilization in China: Volume 5, Chemistry and Chemical Technology, Part 4, Spagyrical Discovery and Invention: Apparatus, Theories and Gifts, Taipei: Caves Books
- —— (1986f), Science and Civilisation In China: Volume 5, Chemistry And Chemical Technology, Part 7, Military Technology, The Gunpowder Epic, Cambridge University Press, ISBN 0-521-30358-3
- —— (1986h), Science and Civilization in China: Volume 6, Biology and Biological Technology, Part 1, Botany, Cambridge University Press
- Needham, Joseph (1994), Science and Civilization in China Volume 5 Part 6, Cambridge University Press
- Needham, Joseph (2008), Science & Civilisation in China Volume 5 Part 11, Cambridge University Press
- Nicolle, David (2003), Medieval Siege Weapons (2): Byzantium, the Islamic World & India AD 476-1526, Osprey Publishing
- Pacey, Arnold (1991), Technology in World Civilization: A Thousand-year History, MIT Press
- Partington, J. R. (1960), A History of Greek Fire and Gunpowder, Cambridge, UK: W. Heffer & Sons.
- Partington, J. R. (1999), A History of Greek Fire and Gunpowder, Baltimore: Johns Hopkins University Press, ISBN 0-8018-5954-9
- Patrick, John Merton (1961), Artillery and warfare during the thirteenth and fourteenth centuries, Utah State University Press.
- Peers, C.J. (2006), Soldiers of the Dragon: Chinese Armies 1500 BC - AD 1840, Osprey Publishing Ltd
- Reilly, Kevin (2012), The Human Journey: A Concise Introduction to World History, Volume 1, Rowman & Littlefield
- Rong, Xinjiang (2013), Eighteen Lectures on Dunhuang, Brill
- Rubinstein, Murray A. (1999), Taiwan: A New History, East Gate Books
- Schafer, Edward H. (1985), The Golden Peaches of Samarkand: A study of T'ang Exotics, University of California Press
- Schottenhammer, Angela (2015), China's Emergence as a Maritime Power
- Shaban, M. A. (1979), The ʿAbbāsid Revolution, Cambridge: Cambridge University Press, ISBN 0-521-29534-3
- Sima, Guang (2015), Bóyángbǎn Zīzhìtōngjiàn 54 huánghòu shīzōng 柏楊版資治通鑑54皇后失蹤, Yuǎnliú chūbǎnshìyè gǔfèn yǒuxiàn gōngsī, ISBN 978-957-32-0876-1
- Skaff, Jonathan Karam (2012), Sui-Tang China and Its Turko-Mongol Neighbors: Culture, Power, and Connections, 580-800 (Oxford Studies in Early Empires), Oxford University Press
- Smith, Paul Jakov (2015), A Crisis in the Literati State
- Standen, Naomi (2007), Unbounded Loyalty Frontier Crossings in Liao China, University of Hawai'i Press
- Tackett, Nicolas (2017), The Origins of the Chinese Nation: Song China and the Forging of an East Asian World Order (illustrated ed.), Cambridge University Press, ISBN 978-1107196773
- Taylor, K.W. (2013), A History of the Vietnamese, Cambridge University Press
- Turnbull, Stephen (2001), Siege Weapons of the Far East (1) AD 612-1300, Osprey Publishing
- Turnbull, Stephen (2002), Siege Weapons of the Far East (2) AD 960-1644, Osprey Publishing
- Twitchett, Denis C. (1979), The Cambridge History of China, Vol. 3, Sui and T'ang China, 589–906, Cambridge University Press
- Twitchett, Denis (1994), "The Liao", The Cambridge History of China, Volume 6, Alien Regime and Border States, 907-1368, Cambridge: Cambridge University Press, pp. 43–153, ISBN 0521243319
- Twitchett, Denis (2009), The Cambridge History of China Volume 5 The Sung dynasty and its Predecessors, 907-1279, Cambridge University Press
- Wagner, Donald B. (2008), Science and Civilization in China Volume 5-11: Ferrous Metallurgy, Cambridge University Press
- Walker, Hugh Dyson (2012), East Asia: A New History, AuthorHouse
- Wang, Zhenping (2013), Tang China in Multi-Polar Asia: A History of Diplomacy and War, University of Hawaii Press
- Whiting, Marvin C. (2002), Imperial Chinese Military History, Writers Club Press
- Wilkinson, Endymion (2012), Chinese History: A New Manual, Harvard University Asia Center for the Harvard-Yenching Institute
- Wilkinson, Endymion (2015), Chinese History: A New Manual, 4th edition, Cambridge, MA: Harvard University Asia Center distributed by Harvard University Press, ISBN 9780674088467
- Wright, David (2005), From War to Diplomatic Parity in Eleventh Century China, Brill
- Xiong, Victor Cunrui (2000), Sui-Tang Chang'an: A Study in the Urban History of Late Medieval China (Michigan Monographs in Chinese Studies), U OF M CENTER FOR CHINESE STUDIES, ISBN 0892641371
- Xiong, Victor Cunrui (2009), Historical Dictionary of Medieval China, United States of America: Scarecrow Press, Inc., ISBN 978-0810860537
- Xu, Elina-Qian (2005), HISTORICAL DEVELOPMENT OF THE PRE-DYNASTIC KHITAN, Institute for Asian and African Studies 7
- Kiernan, Ben (2019). Việt Nam: a history from earliest time to the present. Oxford University Press. ISBN 9780190053796.
- Xue, Zongzheng (1992), Turkic peoples, 中国社会科学出版社
- Yuan, Shu (2001), Bóyángbǎn Tōngjiàn jìshìběnmò 28 dìèrcìhuànguánshídài 柏楊版通鑑記事本末28第二次宦官時代, Yuǎnliú chūbǎnshìyè gǔfèn yǒuxiàn gōngsī, ISBN 957-32-4273-7
- Yule, Henry (1915), Cathay and the Way Thither: Being a Collection of Medieval Notices of China, Vol I: Preliminary Essay on the Intercourse Between China and the Western Nations Previous to the Discovery of the Cape Route, Hakluyt Society
- Song Dynasty in China
- China 7 BC To 1279
