= Song dynasty =

Imperial dynasty of China (960–1279)

Song 宋
- 960–1279
- The Song dynasty at its greatest extent in 1111
- Capital: Bianjing (960–1127); Yingtian (1127–1128); Yangzhou (1128–1129); Lin'an (1129, 1138–1276); Jiangning (1129–1138)
- Common languages: Middle Chinese
- Religion: Chinese Buddhism, Taoism, Confucianism, Chinese folk religion, Islam, Chinese Manichaeism
- Government: Monarchy
- Emperor
  - 960–976: Emperor Taizu (founder of Northern Song)
  - 1127–1162: Emperor Gaozong (founder of Southern Song)
  - 1278–1279: Zhao Bing (last)
- Historical era: Post-classical
  - Established: 4 February 960
  - Signing of the Chanyuan Treaty with Liao: 1005
  - Alliance with Jin: 1115–1125
  - Jingkang incident: 1127
  - Beginning of Mongol invasion: 1235
  - Fall of Lin'an: 4 February 1276
  - Battle of Yamen (end of dynasty): 19 March 1279

Area
- 958 est.: 800,000 km^{2} (310,000 sq mi)
- 980 est.: 3,100,000 km^{2} (1,200,000 sq mi)
- 1127 est.: 2,100,000 km^{2} (810,000 sq mi)
- 1204 est.: 1,800,000 km^{2} (690,000 sq mi)

Population
  - 1120s: Northern: 80–110 million; Southern: 65 million
- GDP (nominal): estimate
  - Per capita: ▲26.5 taels
- Currency: Jiaozi, Guanzi, Huizi, Chinese cash
Preceded by
Later Zhou
Jingnan
Later Shu
Southern Han
Southern Tang
Wuyue
Northern Han
Succeeded by
Jin dynasty
Yuan dynasty

Chinese name
- Chinese: 宋朝
Transcriptions
Standard Mandarin
- Hanyu Pinyin: Sòngcháo
- Bopomofo: ㄙㄨㄥˋ ㄔㄠˊ
- Wade–Giles: Sung^{4} chʻao^{2}
- Yale Romanization: Sùng-cháu
- IPA: [sʊ̂ŋ ʈʂʰǎʊ]
Wu
- Romanization: Son zau
Yue: Cantonese
- Yale Romanization: Sung chìuh
- Jyutping: Sung3 ciu4
- IPA: [sʊŋ˧ tsʰiw˩]
Southern Min
- Tâi-lô: Sòng tiâu
Middle Chinese
- Middle Chinese: /suoŋ^{H} ʈˠiᴇu/

The Song dynasty (/sʊŋ/ SUUNG) was an imperial dynasty of China that ruled from 960 to 1279. The dynasty was founded by Emperor Taizu of Song, who usurped the throne of the Later Zhou dynasty and went on to conquer the rest of the Ten Kingdoms, ending the Five Dynasties and Ten Kingdoms period. The Song often came into conflict with the contemporaneous Liao, Western Xia, and Jin dynasties in northern China. After retreating to southern China following attacks by the Jin dynasty, the Song was eventually conquered by the Mongol-led Yuan dynasty.

The dynasty's history is divided into two periods: during the Northern Song (北宋; 960–1127), the capital was in the northern city of Bianjing (now Kaifeng) and the dynasty controlled most of what is now East China. The Southern Song (南宋; 1127–1279) comprised the period following the loss of control over the northern half of Song territory to the Jurchen-led Jin dynasty in the Jin–Song wars. At that time, the Song court retreated south of the Yangtze and established its capital at Lin'an (now Hangzhou). Although the Song dynasty had lost control of the traditional Chinese heartlands around the Yellow River, the Southern Song Empire contained a large population and productive agricultural land, sustaining a robust economy. In 1234, the Jin dynasty was conquered by the Mongols, who took control of northern China, maintaining uneasy relations with the Southern Song. Möngke Khan, the fourth Great Khan of the Mongol Empire, died in 1259 while besieging the mountain castle Diaoyucheng in Chongqing. His younger brother Kublai Khan was proclaimed the new Great Khan and in 1271 founded the Yuan dynasty. After two decades of sporadic warfare, Kublai Khan's armies conquered the Song dynasty in 1279 after defeating the Southern Song in the Battle of Yamen, and reunited China under the Yuan dynasty.

Technology, science, philosophy, mathematics, and engineering flourished during the Song era. The Song dynasty was the first in world history to issue banknotes or true paper money and the first Chinese government to establish a permanent standing navy. This dynasty saw the first surviving records of the chemical formula for gunpowder, the invention of gunpowder weapons such as fire arrows, bombs, and the fire lance. It also saw the first discernment of true north using a compass, first recorded description of the pound lock, and improved designs of astronomical clocks. Economically, the Song dynasty was unparalleled with a gross domestic product three times larger than that of Europe during the 12th century. China's population doubled in size between the 10th and 11th centuries. This growth was made possible by expanded rice cultivation, use of early-ripening rice from Southeast and South Asia, and production of widespread food surpluses. The Northern Song census recorded 20 million households, double that of the Han and Tang dynasties. It is estimated that the Northern Song had a population of 90 million people. This dramatic increase of population fomented an economic revolution in pre-modern China.

The expansion of the population, growth of cities, and emergence of a national economy led to the gradual withdrawal of the central government from direct intervention in the economy. The lower gentry assumed a larger role in local administration and affairs. Song society was vibrant, and cities had lively entertainment quarters. Citizens gathered to view and trade artwork, and intermingled at festivals and in private clubs. The spread of literature and knowledge was enhanced by the rapid expansion of woodblock printing and the 11th-century invention of movable type printing. Philosophers such as Cheng Yi and Zhu Xi reinvigorated Confucianism with new commentary, infused with Buddhist ideals, and emphasized a new organization of classic texts that established the doctrine of Neo-Confucianism. Although civil service examinations had existed since the Sui dynasty, they became much more prominent in the Song period. Officials gaining power through imperial examination led to a shift from a military-aristocratic elite to a scholar-bureaucratic elite.

== History ==
=== Northern Song, 960–1127 ===
Court portrait of Emperor Taizu (r. 960–976)

After usurping the throne of the Later Zhou dynasty, Emperor Taizu of Song (r. 960–976) spent sixteen years conquering the rest of China proper, reuniting much of the territory that had once belonged to the Han and Tang empires and ending the upheaval of the Five Dynasties and Ten Kingdoms period. In Kaifeng, he established a strong central government over the empire. The establishment of this capital marked the start of the Northern Song period. He ensured administrative stability by promoting the civil service examination system of drafting state bureaucrats by skill and merit (instead of aristocratic or military position) and promoted projects that ensured efficiency in communication throughout the empire. In one such project, cartographers created detailed maps of each province and city that were then collected in a large atlas. Emperor Taizu also promoted groundbreaking scientific and technological innovations by supporting works like the astronomical clock tower designed and built by the engineer Zhang Sixun.

The Song court maintained diplomatic relations with Chola India, the Fatimid Caliphate of Egypt, Srivijaya in modern-day Indonesia, the Kara-Khanid Khanate in Central Asia, the Goryeo Kingdom in Korea, Đại Cồ Việt and the Kingdom of Champa in Vietnam, and other countries that were also trade partners with Japan. Chinese records even mention an embassy from the ruler of "Fu lin" (拂菻, i.e. the Byzantine Empire), Michael VII Doukas, and its arrival in 1081. However, China's closest neighbouring states had the greatest impact on its domestic and foreign policy. From its inception under Taizu, the Song dynasty alternated between warfare and diplomacy with the ethnic Khitans of the Liao dynasty in the northeast and with the Tanguts of the Western Xia in the northwest. The Song dynasty used military force in an attempt to quell the Liao dynasty and to recapture the Sixteen Prefectures, a territory under Khitan control since 938 that was traditionally considered to be part of China proper (most parts of today's Beijing and Tianjin). Song forces were repulsed by the Liao forces, who engaged in aggressive yearly campaigns into Northern Song territory until 1005, when the signing of the Chanyuan Treaty ended these northern border clashes. The Song were forced to provide tribute to the Khitans, although this did little damage to the Song economy since the Khitans were economically dependent upon importing massive amounts of goods from the Song. More significantly, the Song state recognized the Liao state as its diplomatic equal. The Song created an extensive defensive forest along the Song–Liao border to thwart potential Khitan cavalry attacks.

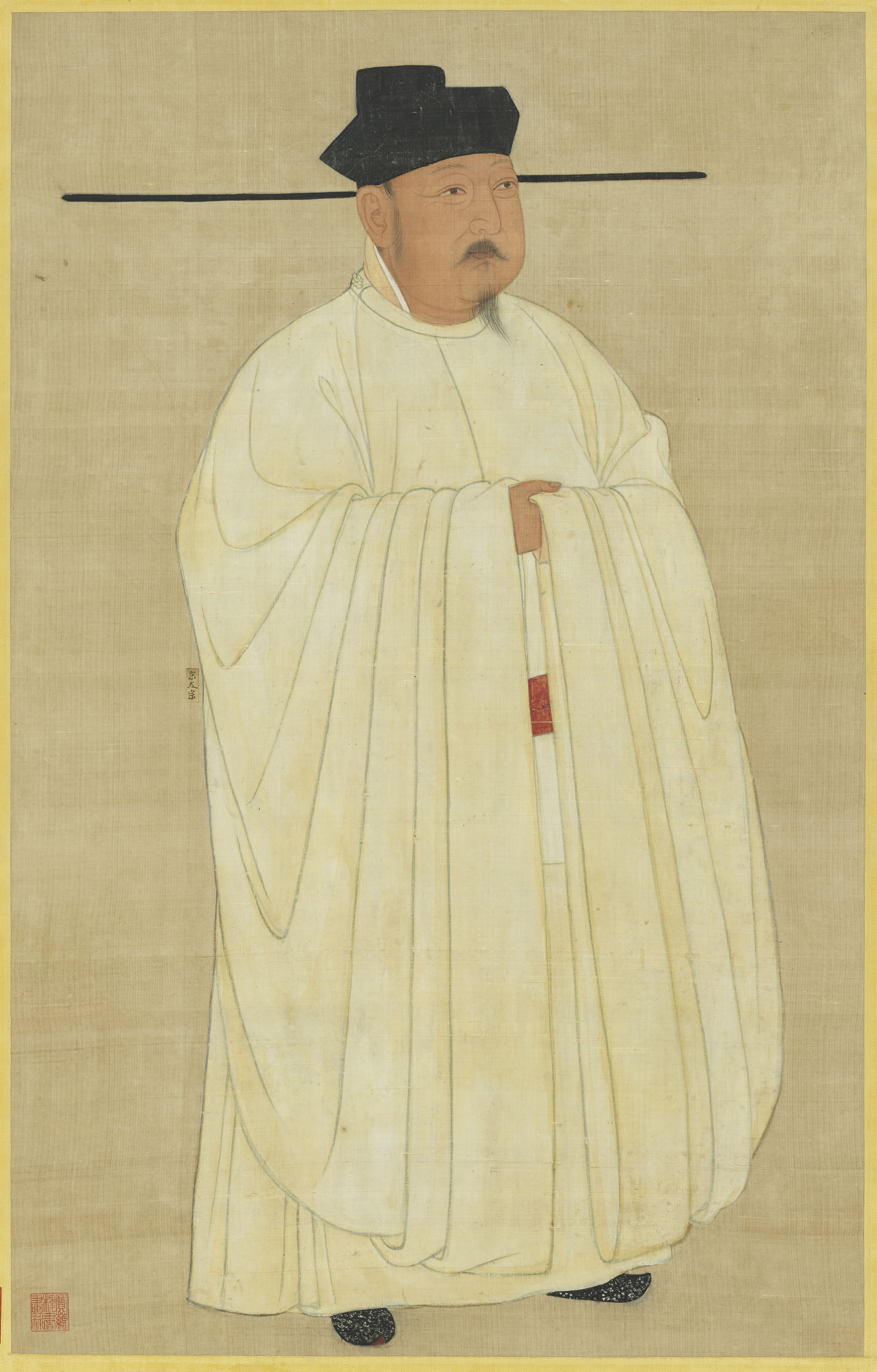
Portrait of Emperor Taizong (r. 976–997)

The Song dynasty managed to win several military victories over the Tanguts in the early 11th century, culminating in a campaign led by the polymath scientist, general, and statesman Shen Kuo (1031–1095). However, this campaign was ultimately a failure due to a rival military officer of Shen disobeying direct orders, and the territory gained from the Western Xia was eventually lost. The Song fought against the Vietnamese kingdom of Đại Việt twice, the first conflict in 981 and later a significant war from 1075 to 1077 over a border dispute and the Song's severing of commercial relations with Đại Việt. After the Vietnamese forces inflicted heavy damages in a raid on Guangxi, the Song commander Guo Kui (1022–1088) penetrated as far as Thăng Long (modern Hanoi). Heavy losses on both sides prompted the Vietnamese commander Thường Kiệt (1019–1105) to make peace overtures, allowing both sides to withdraw from the war effort; captured territories held by both Song and Vietnamese were mutually exchanged in 1082, along with prisoners of war.

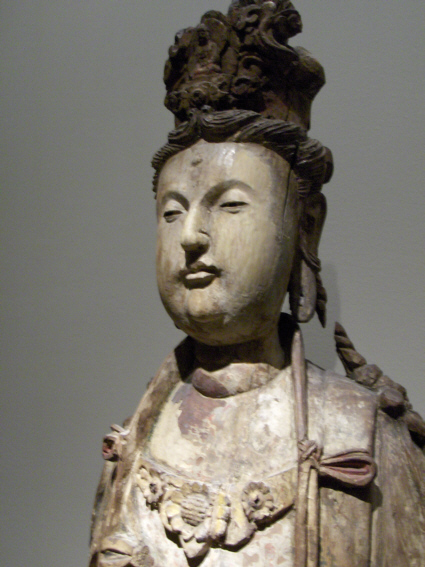
A Song-era wooden Bodhisattva

During the 11th century, political rivalries divided members of the court due to the ministers' differing approaches, opinions, and policies regarding the handling of the Song's complex society and thriving economy. The idealist Chancellor, Fan Zhongyan (989–1052), was the first to receive a heated political backlash when he attempted to institute the Qingli Reforms, which included measures such as improving the recruitment system of officials, increasing the salaries for minor officials, and establishing sponsorship programs to allow a wider range of people to be well educated and eligible for state service.

After Fan was forced to step down from his office, Wang Anshi (1021–1086) became Chancellor of the imperial court. With the backing of Emperor Shenzong (1067–1085), Wang Anshi severely criticized the educational system and state bureaucracy. Seeking to resolve what he saw as state corruption and negligence, Wang implemented a series of reforms called the New Policies. These involved land value tax reform, the establishment of several government monopolies, the support of local militias, and the creation of higher standards for the Imperial examination to make it more practical for men skilled in statecraft to pass.

The reforms created political factions in the court. Wang Anshi's "New Policies Group" (Xin Fa), also known as the "Reformers", were opposed by the ministers in the "Conservative" faction led by the historian and Chancellor Sima Guang (1019–1086). As one faction supplanted another in the majority position of the court ministers, it would demote rival officials and exile them to govern remote frontier regions of the empire. One of the prominent victims of the political rivalry, the famous poet and statesman Su Shi (1037–1101), was jailed and eventually exiled for criticizing Wang's reforms.

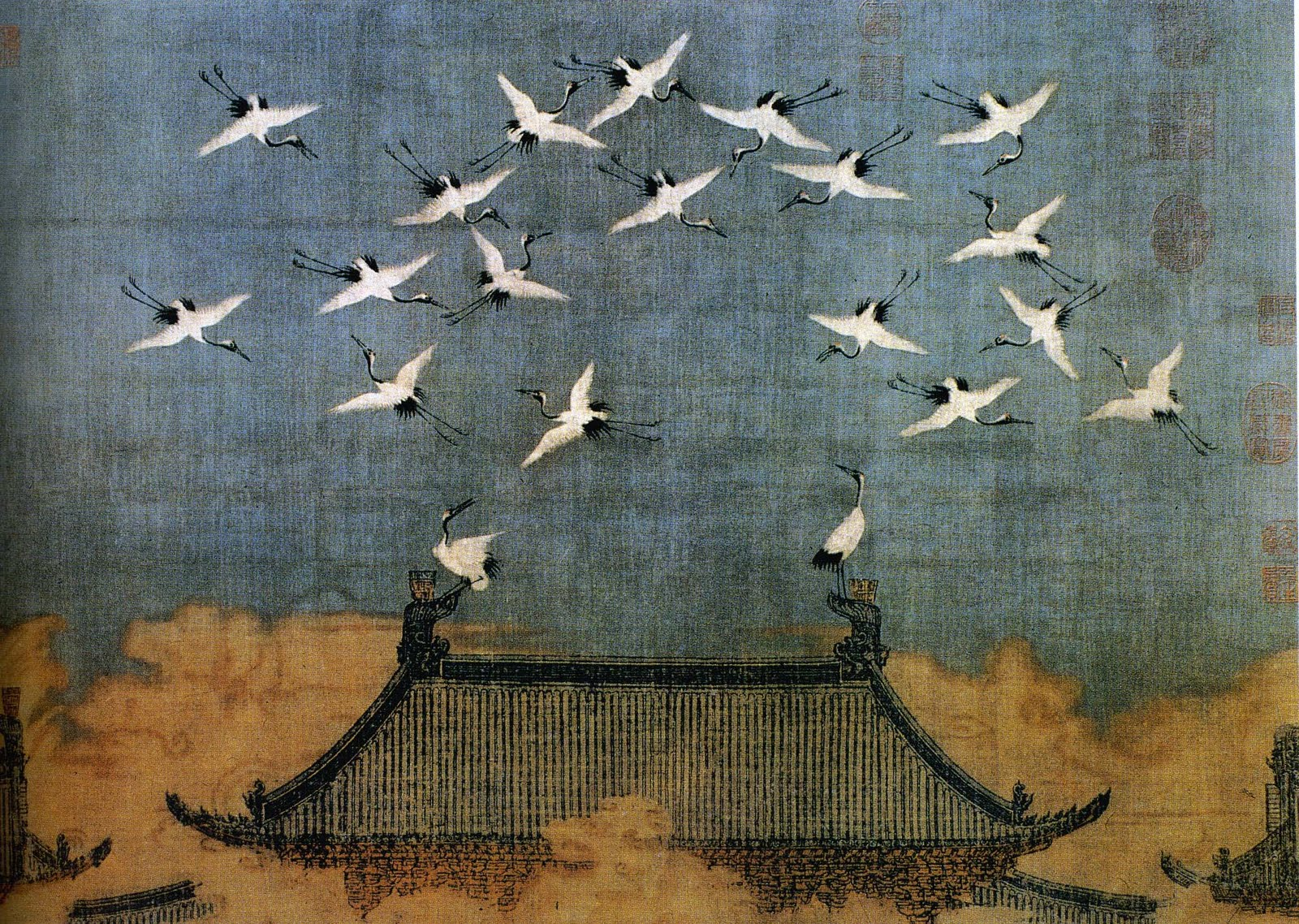
Auspicious Cranes, a painting of the Song royal palace by Emperor Huizong

The continual alternation between reform and conservatism had effectively weakened the dynasty. This decline can also be attributed to Cai Jing (1047–1126), who was appointed by Emperor Zhezong (1085–1100) and who remained in power until 1125. He revived the New Policies and pursued political opponents, tolerated corruption and encouraged Emperor Huizong (1100–1126) to neglect his duties to focus on artistic pursuits. Later, a peasant rebellion broke out in Zhejiang and Fujian, headed by Fang La in 1120. The rebellion may have been caused by an increasing tax burden, the concentration of landownership and oppressive government measures.

While the central Song court remained politically divided and focused upon its internal affairs, alarming new events to the north in the Liao state finally came to its attention. The Jurchen, a subject tribe of the Liao, rebelled against them and formed their own state, the Jin dynasty. The Song official Tong Guan (1054–1126) advised Emperor Huizong to form an alliance with the Jurchens, and the joint military campaign under this Alliance Conducted at Sea toppled and completely conquered the Liao dynasty by 1125. During the joint attack, the Song's northern expedition army removed the defensive forest along the Song–Liao border.

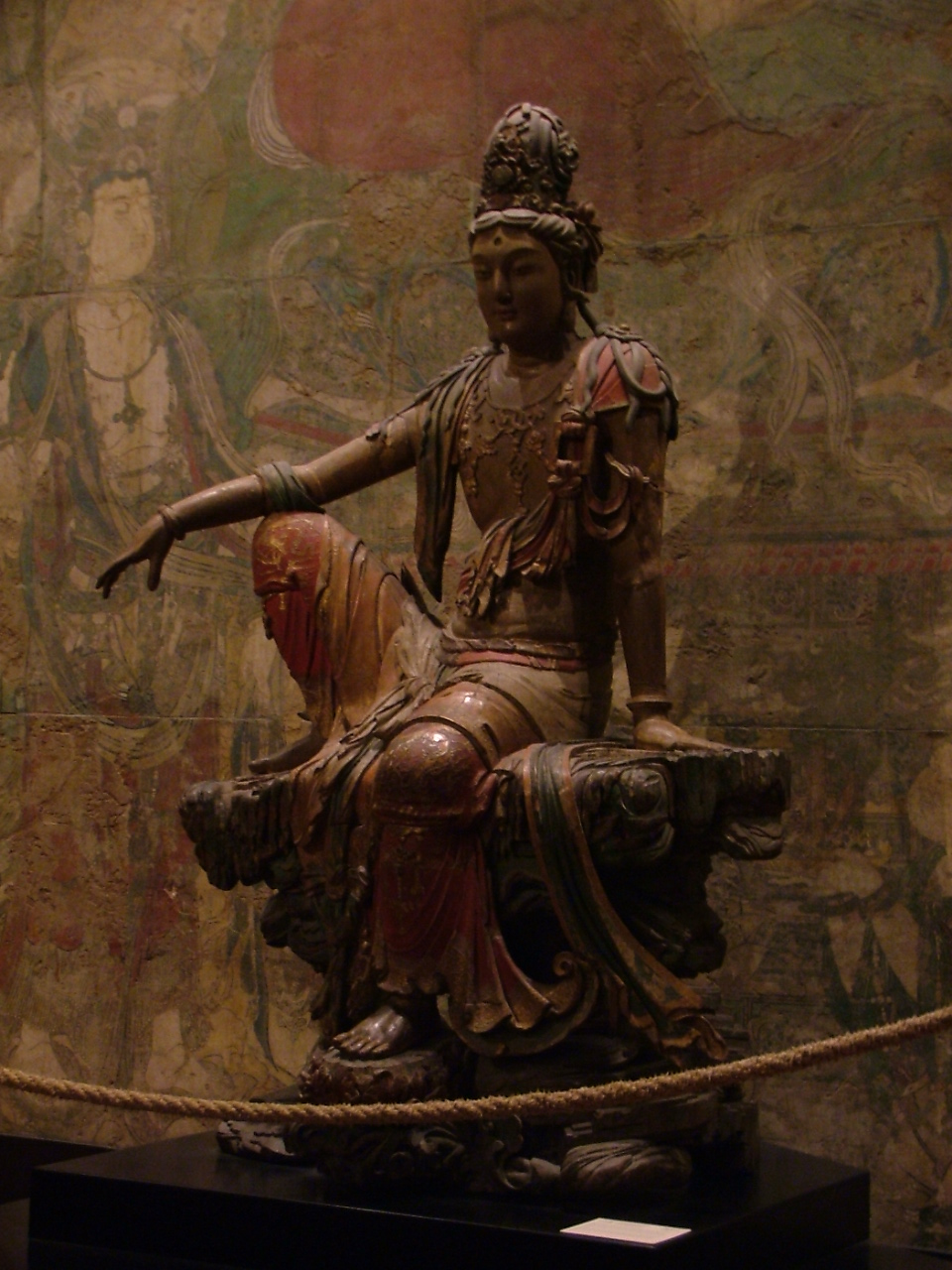
A Liao dynasty (907–1125) polychrome wood-carved statue of Guanyin, Shanxi

However, the poor performance and military weakness of the Song army was observed by the Jurchens, who immediately broke the alliance, beginning the Jin–Song Wars of 1125 and 1127. Because of the removal of the previous defensive forest, the Jin army marched quickly across the North China Plain to Kaifeng. In the Jingkang Incident during the latter invasion, the Jurchens captured not only the capital, but the retired Emperor Huizong, his successor Emperor Qinzong, and most of the Imperial court.

The remaining Song forces regrouped under the self-proclaimed Emperor Gaozong (1127–1162) and withdrew south of the Yangtze to establish a new capital at Lin'an (modern Hangzhou). The Jurchen conquest of North China and shift of capitals from Kaifeng to Lin'an was the dividing line between the Northern and Southern Song dynasties. After their fall to the Jin, the Song lost control of North China. Now occupying what has been traditionally known as "China proper", the Jin regarded themselves the rightful rulers of China. The Jin later chose earth as their dynastic element and yellow as their royal color. According to the theory of the Five Elements (wuxing), the earth element follows the fire, the dynastic element of the Song, in the sequence of elemental creation. Therefore, their ideological move showed that the Jin considered Song reign in China complete, with the Jin replacing the Song as the rightful rulers of China proper.

=== Southern Song, 1127–1279 ===
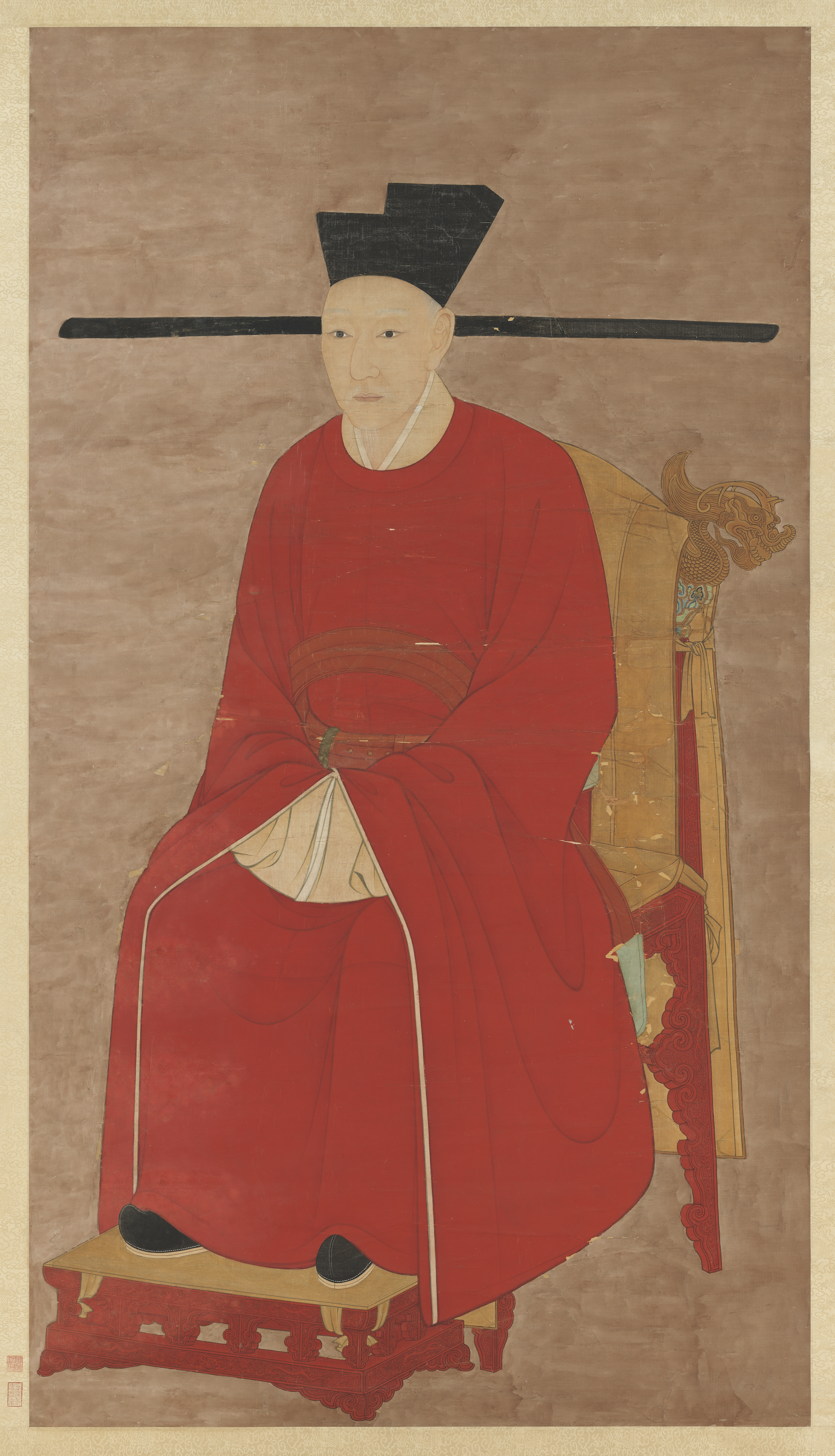
A portrait of Emperor Gaozong of Song (r. 1127–1162)

Southern Song in 1142. The western and southern borders remain unchanged from the previous map. However, the north of the Qinling Huaihe Line was under the control of the Jin dynasty. The Xia dynasty's territory generally remained unchanged. In the southwest, the Song dynasty bordered a territory about a sixth its size, the Dali dynasty.

Although weakened and pushed south beyond the Huai River, the Southern Song found new ways to bolster its strong economy and defend itself against the Jin dynasty. The government sponsored massive shipbuilding and harbor improvement projects, and the construction of beacons and seaport warehouses to support maritime trade abroad, including at the major international seaports, such as Quanzhou, Guangzhou, and Xiamen, that were sustaining China's commerce.

To protect and support the multitude of ships sailing into the East China Sea and Yellow Sea (to Korea and Japan), Southeast Asia, the Indian Ocean, and the Red Sea, it was necessary to establish an official standing navy. The Song dynasty therefore established China's first permanent navy in 1132, with a headquarters at Dinghai. With a permanent navy, the Song were prepared to face the naval forces of the Jin on the Yangtze River in 1161, in the Battle of Tangdao and the Battle of Caishi. During these battles the Song navy employed swift paddle wheel-driven naval vessels armed with traction trebuchet catapults aboard the decks that launched gunpowder bombs. Although the Jin forces commanded by Wanyan Liang (the Prince of Hailing) boasted 70,000 men on 600 warships, and the Song forces only 3,000 men on 120 warships, the Song dynasty forces were victorious in both battles due to the destructive power of the bombs and the rapid assaults by paddlewheel ships. The strength of the navy was heavily emphasized following these victories. A century after the navy was founded it had grown in size to 52,000 fighting marines.

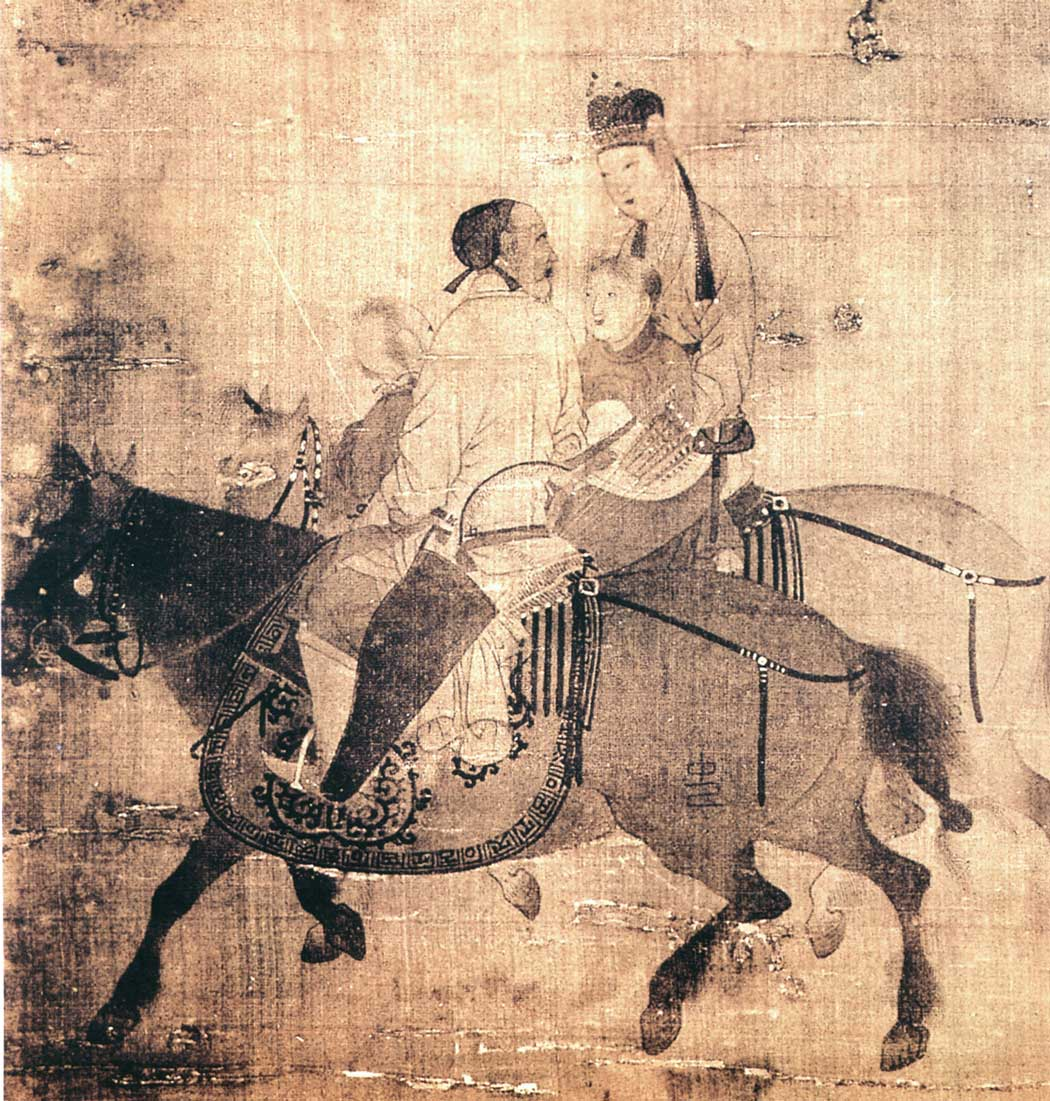
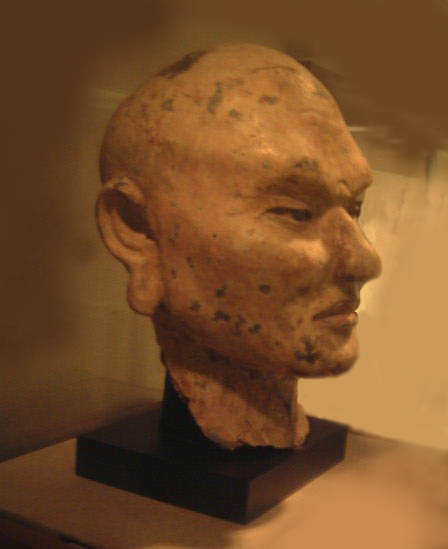
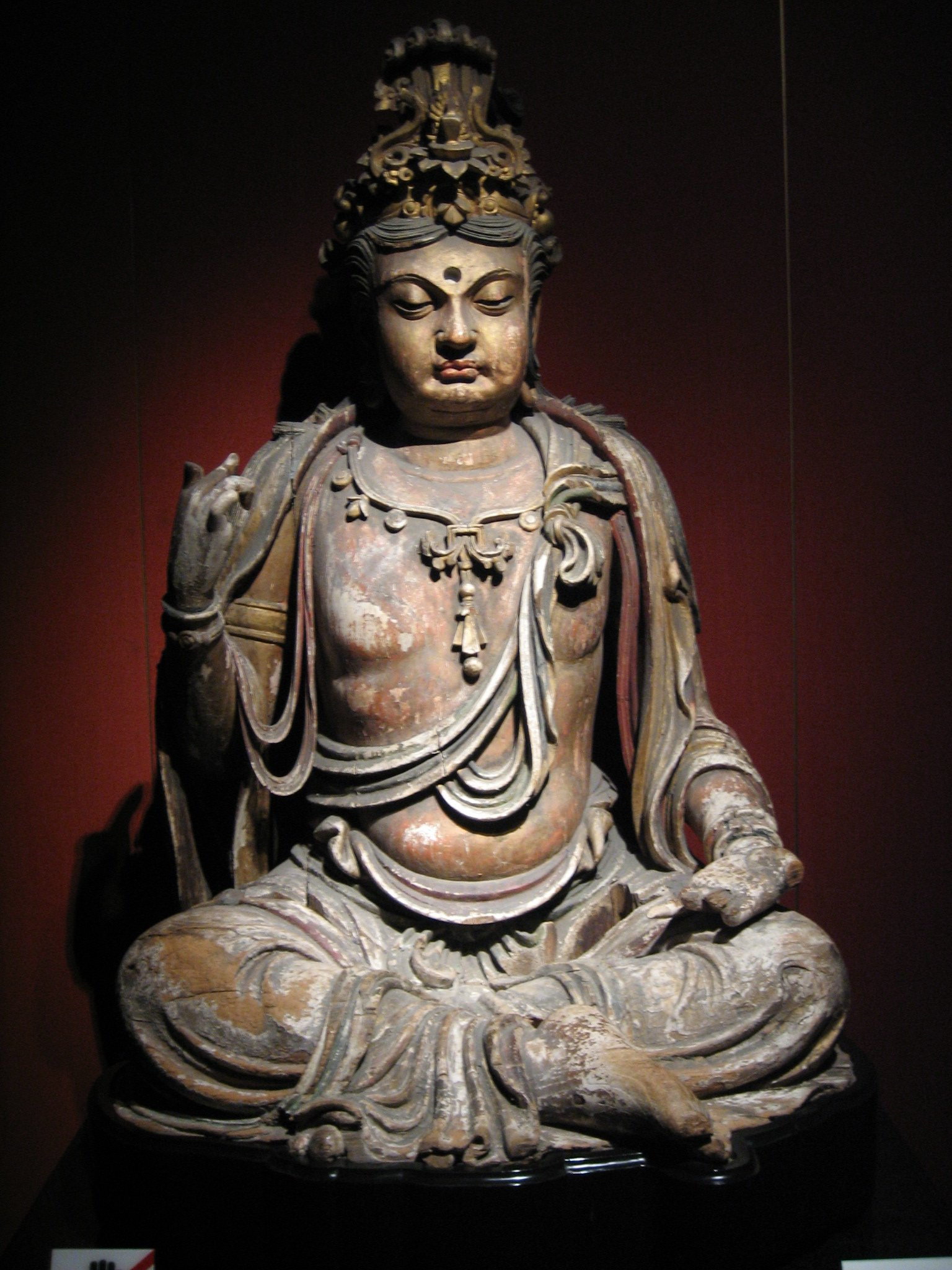
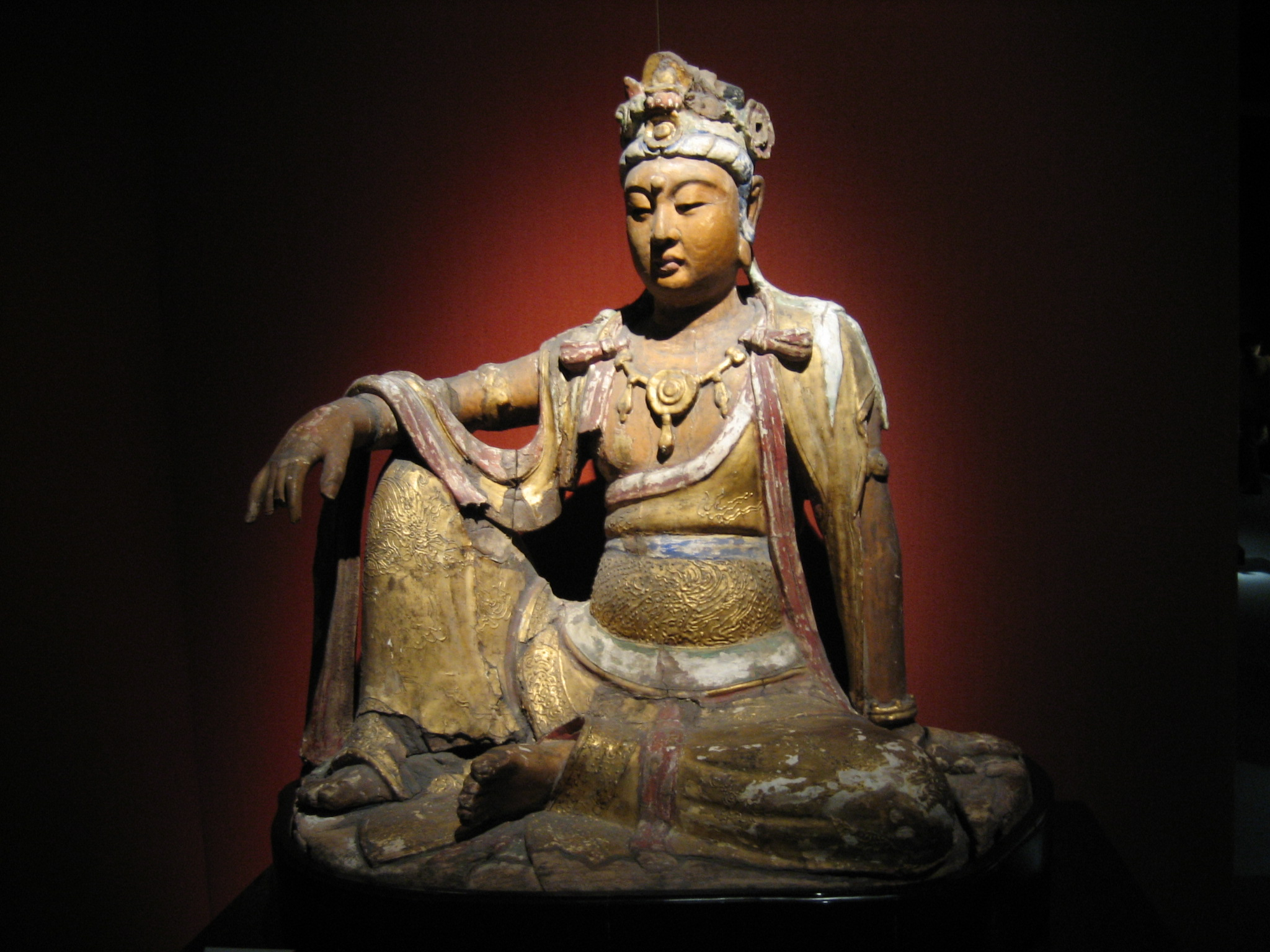
Clockwise from upper left: Anonymous painting of Cai Wenji and her Xiongnu husband (Zuoxianwang) dating from the Southern Song. A head sculpture of an arhat, 11th century. A seated wooden Bodhisattva statue, Jin dynasty (1115–1234). A wooden Bodhisattva statue from the Song dynasty (960–1279)

The Song government confiscated portions of land owned by the landed gentry in order to raise revenue for these projects, an act which caused dissension and loss of loyalty amongst leading members of Song society but did not stop the Song's defensive preparations. Financial matters were made worse by the fact that many wealthy, land-owning families—some of which had officials working for the government—used their social connections with those in office in order to obtain tax-exempt status.

Although the Song dynasty was able to hold back the Jin, a new foe came to power over the steppe, deserts, and plains north of the Jin dynasty. The Mongols, led by Genghis Khan (r. 1206–1227), initially invaded the Jin dynasty in 1205 and 1209, engaging in large raids across its borders, and in 1211 an enormous Mongol army was assembled to invade the Jin. The Jin dynasty was forced to submit and pay tribute to the Mongols as vassals; when the Jin suddenly moved their capital city from Beijing to Kaifeng, the Mongols saw this as a revolt. Under the leadership of Ögedei Khan (r.1229–1241), both the Jin dynasty and Western Xia dynasty were conquered by Mongol forces in 1233/34.

The Mongols were allied with the Song, but this alliance was broken when the Song recaptured the former imperial capitals of Kaifeng, Luoyang, and Chang'an at the collapse of the Jin dynasty. After the first Mongol invasion of Vietnam in 1258, Mongol general Uriyangkhadai attacked Guangxi from Hanoi as part of a coordinated Mongol attack in 1259 with armies attacking in Sichuan under Mongol leader Möngke Khan and other Mongol armies attacking in modern-day Shandong and Henan. On August 11, 1259, Möngke Khan died during the siege of Diaoyu Castle in Chongqing.

His successor Kublai Khan continued the assault against the Song, gaining a temporary foothold on the southern banks of the Yangtze. By the winter of 1259, Uriyangkhadai's army fought its way north to meet Kublai's army, which was besieging Ezhou in Hubei. Kublai made preparations to take Ezhou, but a pending civil war with his brother Ariq Böke—a rival claimant to the Mongol Khaganate—forced Kublai to move back north with the bulk of his forces. In Kublai's absence, the Song forces were ordered by Chancellor Jia Sidao to make an immediate assault and succeeded in pushing the Mongol forces back to the northern banks of the Yangtze. There were minor border skirmishes until 1265, when Kublai won a significant battle in Sichuan.

From 1268 to 1273, Kublai blockaded the Yangtze River with his navy and besieged Xiangyang, the last obstacle in his way to invading the rich Yangtze River basin. Kublai officially declared the creation of the Yuan dynasty in 1271. In 1275, a Song force of 130,000 troops under Chancellor Jia Sidao was defeated by Kublai's newly appointed commander-in-chief, general Bayan. By 1276, most of the Song territory had been captured by Yuan forces, including the capital Lin'an.

In the Battle of Yamen on the Pearl River Delta in 1279, the Yuan army, led by the general Zhang Hongfan, finally crushed the Song resistance. The last remaining ruler, the 7-year-old emperor Zhao Bing, committed suicide, along with Prime Minister Lu Xiufu. On Kublai's orders carried out by his commander Bayan, the rest of the former imperial family of Song were unharmed. The deposed Emperor Gong was demoted, being given the title 'Duke of Ying', but he was eventually exiled to Tibet where he took up a monastic life. The former emperor would eventually be forced to commit suicide under the orders of Kublai's great-great-grandson, Gegeen Khan, out of fear that Emperor Gong would stage a coup to restore his reign. Other members of the Song imperial family continued to live under Mongol control, including the renowned artist Zhao Mengfu, who served the Yuan court as an advisor.

== Culture and society ==
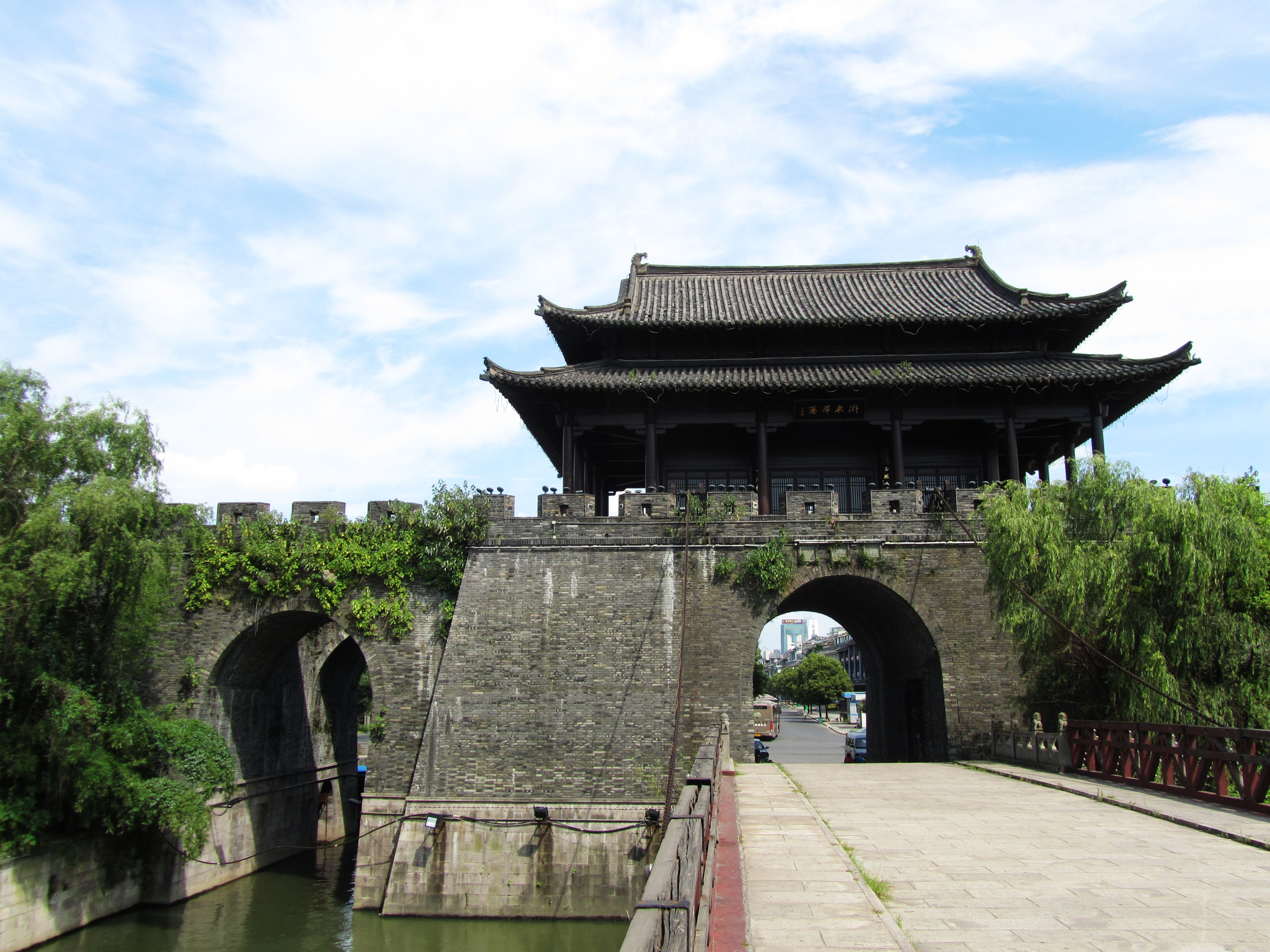
A city gate of Shaoxing, Zhejiang province, built in 1223 during the Song dynasty

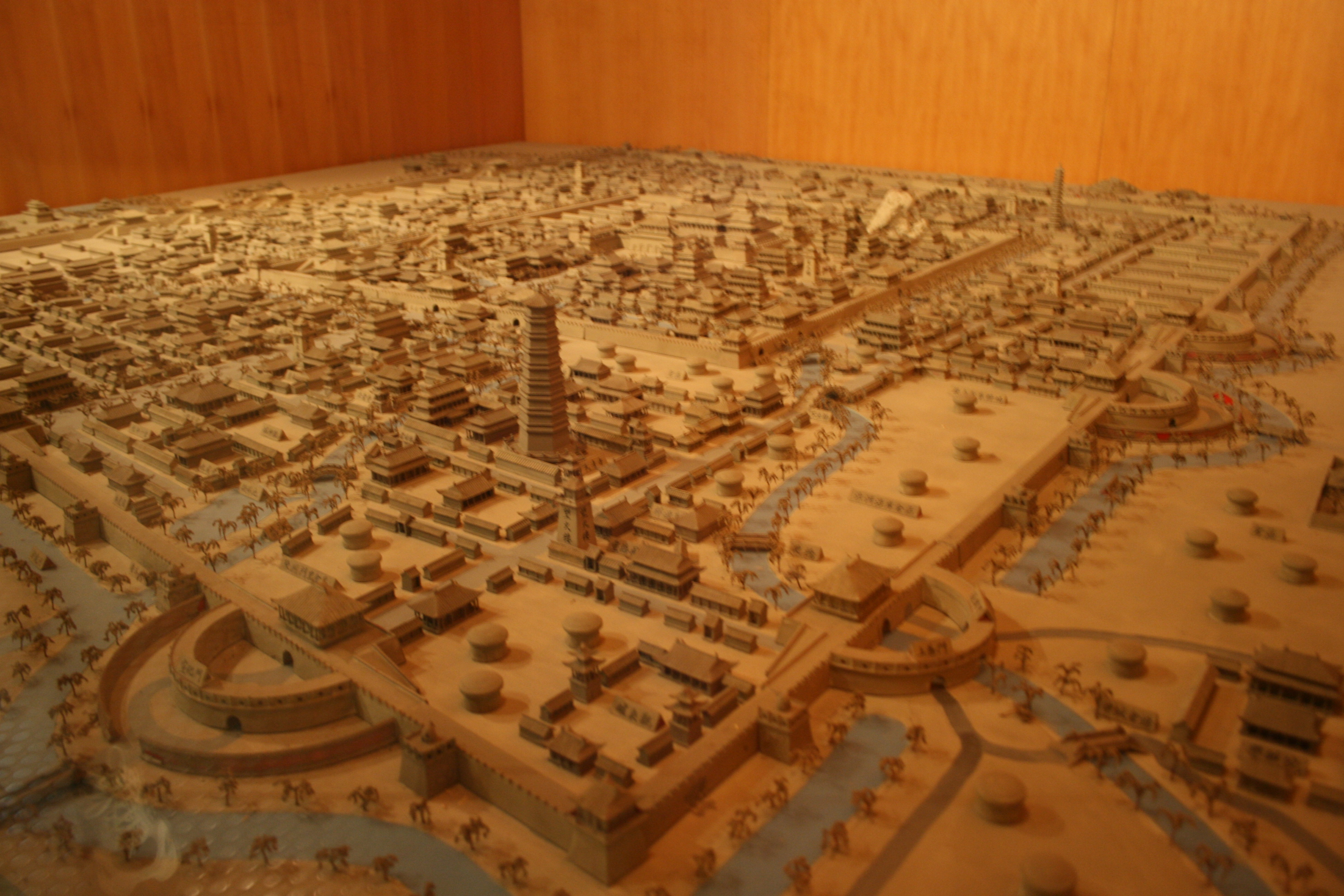
Model of the capital city Kaifeng

The Song dynasty was an era of administrative sophistication and complex social organization. Some of the largest cities in the world were found in China during this period (Kaifeng and Hangzhou had populations of over a million). People enjoyed various social clubs and entertainment in the cities, and there were many schools and temples to provide the people with education and religious services. The Song government supported social welfare programs including the establishment of retirement homes, public clinics, and paupers' graveyards. The Song dynasty supported a widespread postal service that was modeled on the earlier Han dynasty (202 BCE – CE 220) postal system to provide swift communication throughout the empire. The central government employed thousands of postal workers of various ranks to provide service for post offices and larger postal stations. In rural areas, farming peasants either owned their own plots of land, paid rents as tenant farmers, or were serfs on large estates.

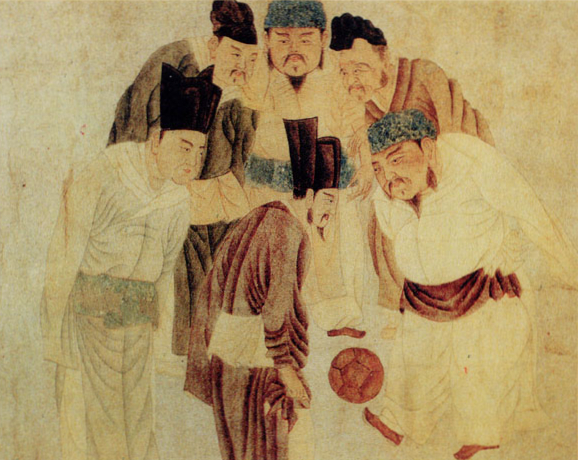
Emperor Taizu of Song, Emperor Taizong of Song, prime minister Zhao Pu and other ministers playing Cuju, an early form of football, by Qian Xuan (1235–1305)

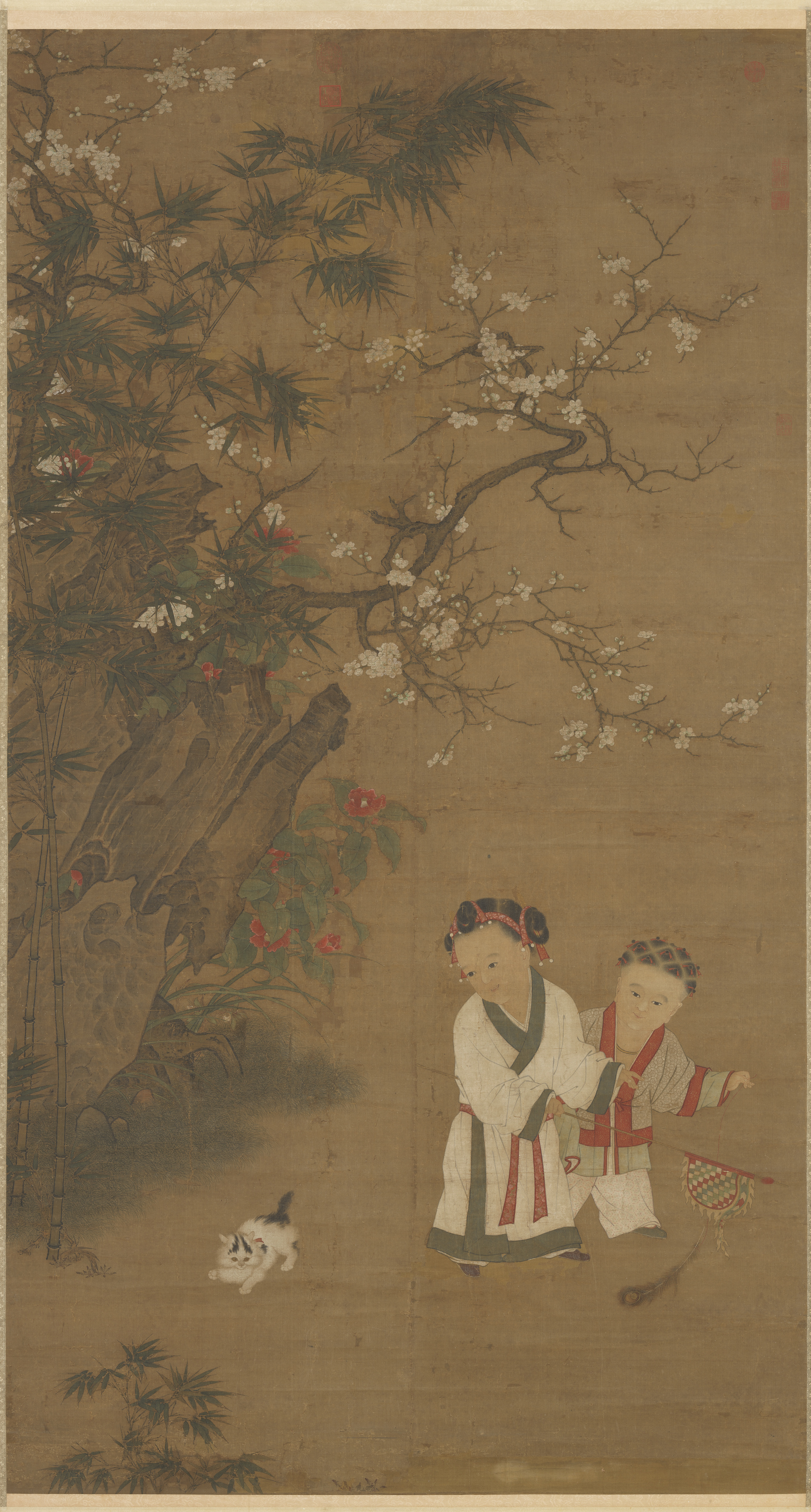
A 12th-century painting by Su Hanchen; a girl waves a peacock feather banner like the one used in dramatical theater to signal an acting leader of troops.

Although women were on a lower social tier than men according to Confucian ethics, they enjoyed many social and legal privileges and wielded considerable power at home and in their own small businesses. As Song society became more and more prosperous and parents on the bride's side of the family provided larger dowries for her marriage, women naturally gained many new legal rights in ownership of property. Under certain circumstances, an unmarried daughter without brothers, or a surviving mother without sons, could inherit one-half of her father's share of undivided family property. There were many notable and well-educated women, and it was a common practice for women to educate their sons during their earliest youth. The mother of the scientist, general, diplomat, and statesman Shen Kuo taught him essentials of military strategy. There were also exceptional women writers and poets, such as Li Qingzhao (1084–1151), who became famous even in her lifetime.

The Song Dynasty used the term “jijian” to characterize male homosexual practices, where the “ji” in the term was used to characterize a man receiving sexual acts. Such a term was derogatory by virtue of its connection with animals deemed inferior to humans. Song Dynasty observed a few cultural pushbacks—led by the Neo-Confucian movement from the dynasty—against homosexual or bisexual practices as urbanization prompted growing male prostitution and other sex work economies. Significantly, the Song government passed laws prohibiting male prostitution, although many other cultural and literary works attested to the continued existence and prominence of men in sex work.

Religion in China during this period had a great effect on people's lives, beliefs, and daily activities, and Chinese literature on spirituality was popular. The major deities of Daoism and Buddhism, ancestral spirits, and the many deities of Chinese folk religion were worshipped with sacrificial offerings. Tansen Sen asserts that more Buddhist monks from India traveled to China during the Song than in the previous Tang dynasty (618–907). With many ethnic foreigners travelling to China to conduct trade or live permanently, there came many foreign religions; religious minorities in China included Middle Eastern Muslims, the Kaifeng Jews, and Persian Manichaeans.

The populace engaged in a vibrant social and domestic life, enjoying such public festivals as the Lantern Festival and the Qingming Festival. There were entertainment quarters in the cities providing a constant array of amusements. There were puppeteers, acrobats, theatre actors, sword swallowers, snake charmers, storytellers, singers and musicians, prostitutes, and places to relax, including tea houses, restaurants, and organized banquets. People attended social clubs in large numbers; there were tea clubs, exotic food clubs, antiquarian and art collectors' clubs, horse-loving clubs, poetry clubs, and music clubs. Like regional cooking and cuisines in the Song, the era was known for its regional varieties of performing arts styles as well. Theatrical drama was very popular amongst the elite and general populace, although Classical Chinese—not the vernacular language—was spoken by actors on stage. The four largest drama theatres in Kaifeng could hold audiences of several thousand each. There were also notable domestic pastimes, as people at home enjoyed activities such as the go and xiangqi board games.

=== Civil service examinations and the gentry ===
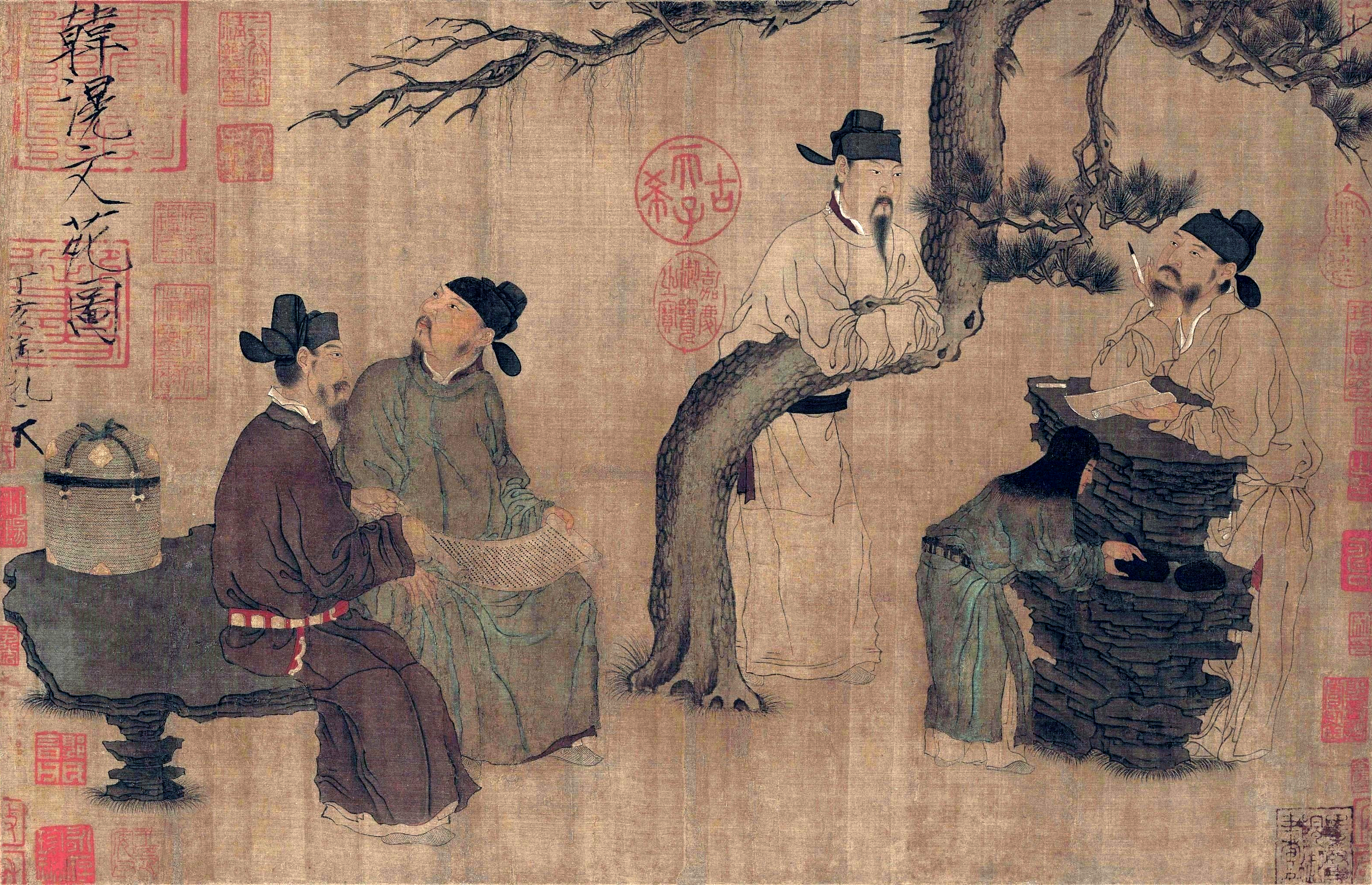
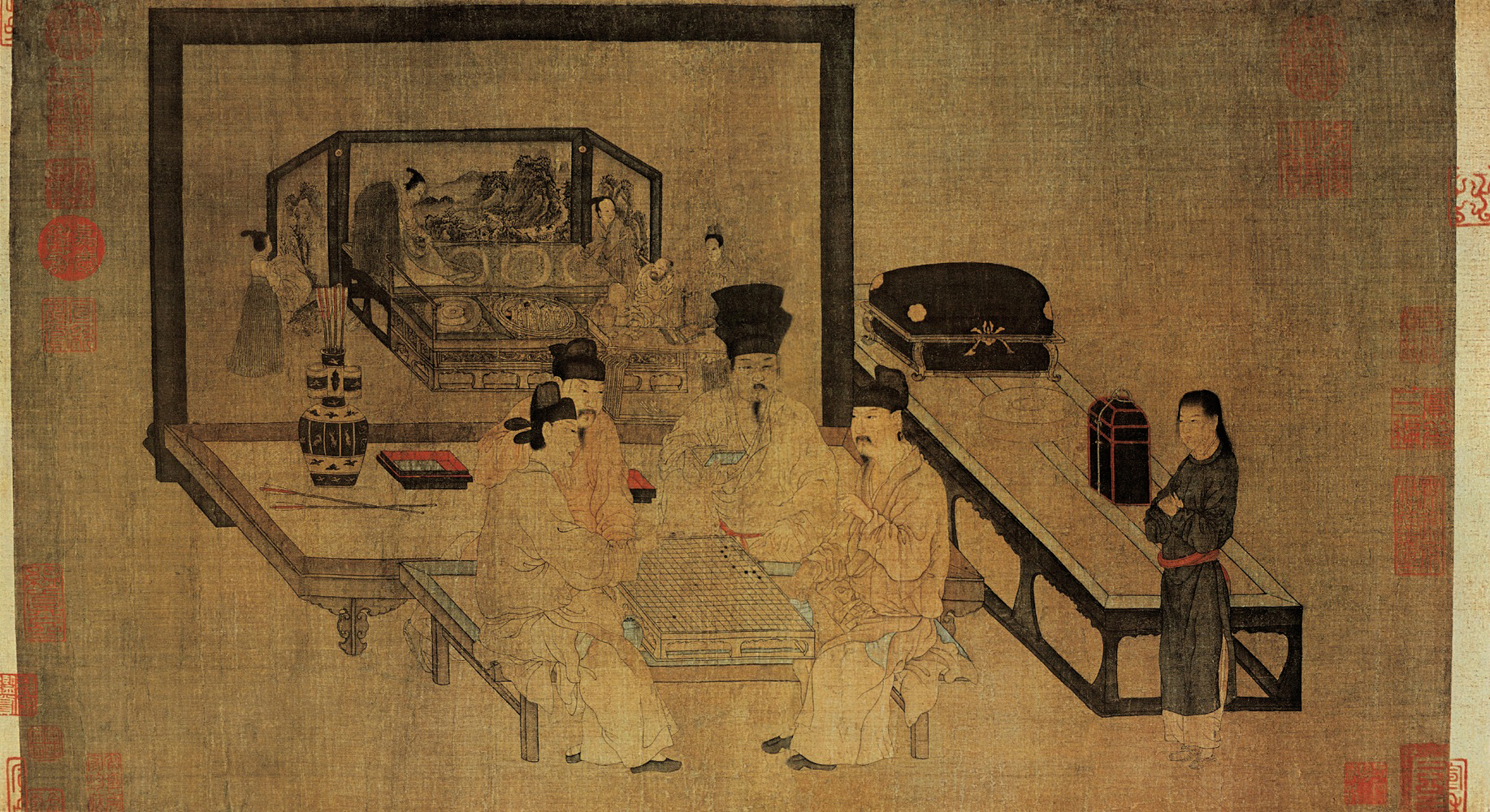
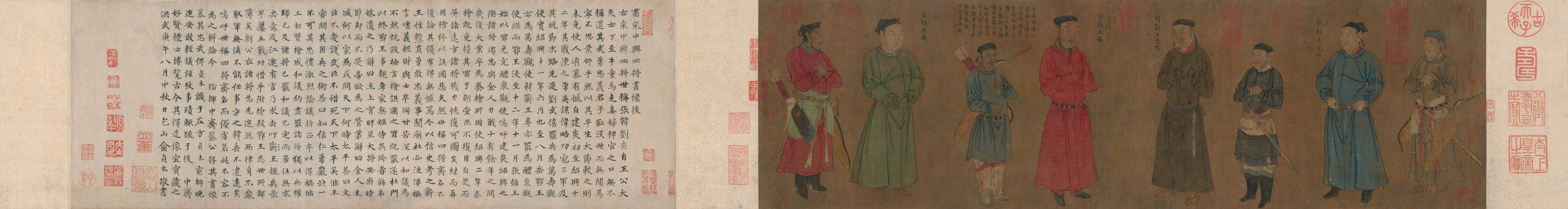
Clockwise from upper left: A Literary Garden, by Zhou Wenju, 10th century; Zhou Wenju, Go players, Palace Museum, Beijing; "Four Generals of Zhongxing" by Southern Song dynasty artist Liu Songnian (1174–1224); the renowned general Yue Fei (1103–1142) is the second person from the left in the latter painting.

During this period greater emphasis was laid upon the civil service system of recruiting officials; this was based upon degrees acquired through competitive examinations, in an effort to select the most capable individuals for governance. Selecting men for office through proven merit was an ancient idea in China. The civil service system became institutionalized on a small scale during the Sui and Tang dynasties, but by the Song period, it became virtually the only means for drafting officials into the government. The advent of widespread printing helped to widely circulate Confucian teachings and to educate more and more eligible candidates for the exams. This can be seen in the number of exam takers for the low-level prefectural exams rising from 30,000 annual candidates in the early 11th century to 400,000 candidates by the late 13th century. The civil service and examination system allowed for greater meritocracy, social mobility, and equality in competition for those wishing to attain an official seat in government. Using statistics gathered by the Song state, Edward A. Kracke, Sudō Yoshiyuki, and Ho Ping-ti supported the hypothesis that simply having a father, grandfather, or great-grandfather who had served as an official of state did not guarantee one would obtain the same level of authority. Robert Hartwell and Robert P. Hymes criticized this model, stating that it places too much emphasis on the role of the nuclear family and considers only three paternal ascendants of exam candidates while ignoring the demographic reality of Song China, the significant proportion of males in each generation that had no surviving sons, and the role of the extended family. Many felt disenfranchised by what they saw as a bureaucratic system that favored the land-holding class able to afford the best education. One of the greatest literary critics of this was the official and famous poet Su Shi. Yet Su was a product of his times, as the identity, habits, and attitudes of the scholar-official had become less aristocratic and more bureaucratic with the transition of the periods from Tang to Song. At the beginning of the dynasty, government posts were disproportionately held by two elite social groups: a founding elite who had ties with the founding emperor and a semi-hereditary professional elite who used long-held clan status, family connections, and marriage alliances to secure appointments. By the late 11th century, the founding elite became obsolete, while political partisanship and factionalism at court undermined the marriage strategies of the professional elite, which dissolved as a distinguishable social group and was replaced by a multitude of gentry families.

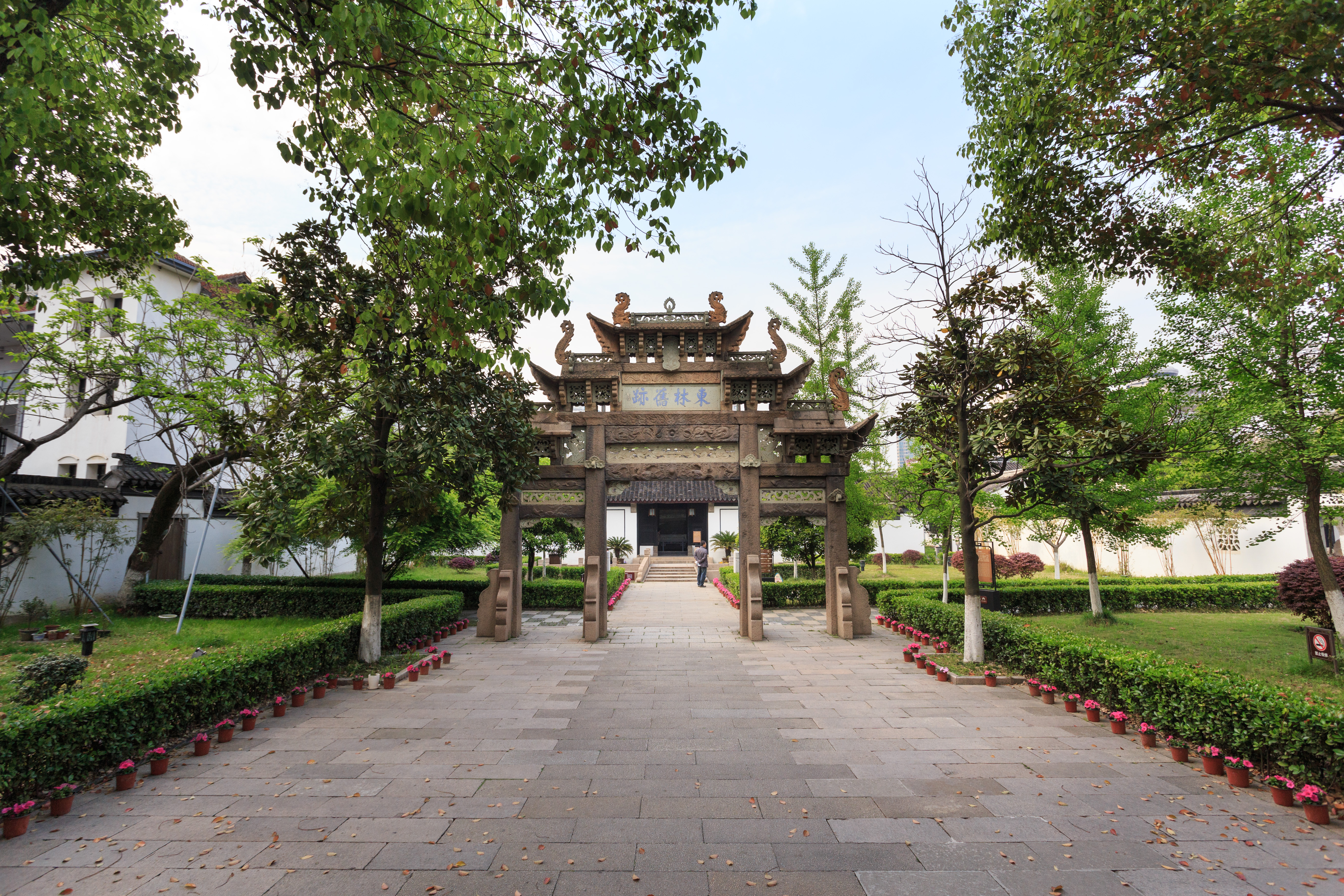
The Donglin Academy, an educational institution equivalent to modern-day college. It was originally built in 1111 during the Northern Song dynasty.

Due to Song's enormous population growth and the body of its appointed scholar-officials being accepted in limited numbers (about 20,000 active officials during the Song period), the larger scholarly gentry class would now take over grassroots affairs on the vast local level. Excluding the scholar-officials in office, this elite social class consisted of exam candidates, examination degree-holders not yet assigned to an official post, local tutors, and retired officials. These learned men, degree-holders, and local elites supervised local affairs and sponsored necessary facilities of local communities; any local magistrate appointed to his office by the government relied upon the cooperation of the few or many local gentry in the area. For example, the Song government—excluding the educational-reformist government under Emperor Huizong—spared little amount of state revenue to maintain prefectural and county schools; instead, the bulk of the funds for schools was drawn from private financing. This limited role of government officials was a departure from the earlier Tang dynasty (618–907), when the government strictly regulated commercial markets and local affairs; now the government withdrew heavily from regulating commerce and relied upon a mass of local gentry to perform necessary duties in their communities.

The gentry distinguished themselves in society through their intellectual and antiquarian pursuits, while the homes of prominent landholders attracted a variety of courtiers, including artisans, artists, educational tutors, and entertainers. Despite the disdain for trade, commerce, and the merchant class exhibited by the highly cultured and elite exam-drafted scholar-officials, commercialism played a prominent role in Song culture and society. A scholar-official would be frowned upon by his peers if he pursued means of profiteering outside of his official salary; however, this did not stop many scholar-officials from managing business relations through the use of intermediary agents.

=== Law, justice, and forensic science ===
The Song judicial system retained most of the legal code of the earlier Tang dynasty, the basis of traditional Chinese law up until the modern era. Roving sheriffs maintained law and order in the municipal jurisdictions and occasionally ventured into the countryside. Official magistrates overseeing court cases were not only expected to be well-versed in written law but also to promote morality in society. Magistrates such as the famed Bao Zheng (999–1062) embodied the upright, moral judge who upheld justice and never failed to live up to his principles. Song judges specified the guilty person or party in a criminal act and meted out punishments accordingly, often in the form of caning. A guilty individual or parties brought to court for a criminal or civil offense were not viewed as wholly innocent until proven otherwise, while even accusers were viewed with a high level of suspicion by the judge. Due to costly court expenses and immediate jailing of those accused of criminal offenses, people in the Song preferred to settle disputes and quarrels privately, without the court's interference.

Shen Kuo's Dream Pool Essays argued against traditional Chinese beliefs in anatomy (such as his argument for two throat valves instead of three); this perhaps spurred the interest in the performance of post-mortem autopsies in China during the 12th century. The physician and judge known as Song Ci (1186–1249) wrote a pioneering work of forensic science on the examination of corpses in order to determine cause of death (strangulation, poisoning, drowning, blows, etc.) and to prove whether death resulted from murder, suicide, or accidental death. Song Ci stressed the importance of proper coroner's conduct during autopsies and the accurate recording of the inquest of each autopsy by official clerks.

=== Military and methods of warfare ===
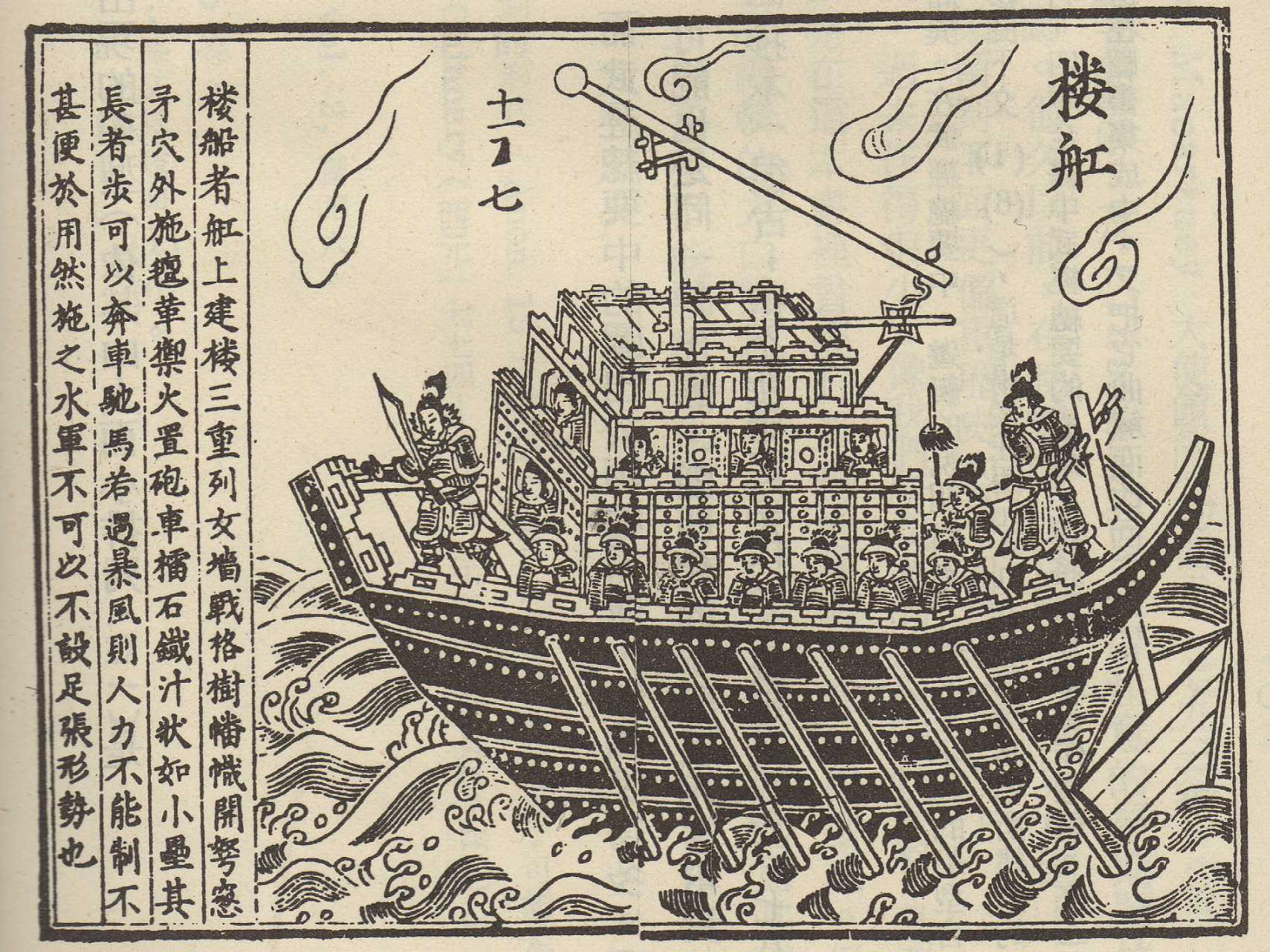
Traction trebuchet on an Early Song dynasty warship from the Wujing Zongyao. Trebuchets like this were used to launch the earliest type of explosive bombs.

The Song military was chiefly organized to ensure that the army could not threaten Imperial control, often at the expense of effectiveness in war. Northern Song's Military Council operated under a Chancellor, who had no control over the imperial army. The imperial army was divided among three marshals, each independently responsible to the Emperor. Since the Emperor rarely led campaigns personally, Song forces lacked unity of command. The imperial court often believed that successful generals endangered royal authority, and relieved or even executed them, notably Li Gang, Yue Fei, and Han Shizhong.

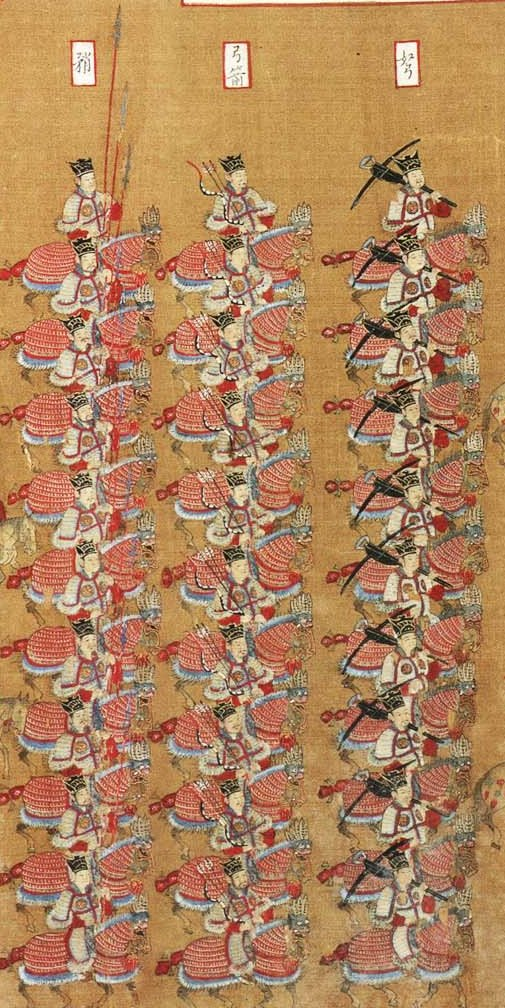
Northern Song dynasty painting of armored cavalry

Although the scholar-officials viewed soldiers as lower members in the hierarchic social order, a person could gain status and prestige in society by becoming a high-ranking military officer with a record of victorious battles. At its height, the Song military had one million soldiers divided into platoons of 50 troops, companies made of two platoons, battalions composed of 500 soldiers. Crossbowmen were separated from the regular infantry and placed in their own units as they were prized combatants, providing effective missile fire against cavalry charges. The government was eager to sponsor new crossbow designs that could shoot at longer ranges, while crossbowmen were also valuable when employed as long-range snipers. Song cavalry employed a slew of different weapons, including halberds, swords, bows, spears, and 'fire lances' that discharged a gunpowder blast of flame and shrapnel.

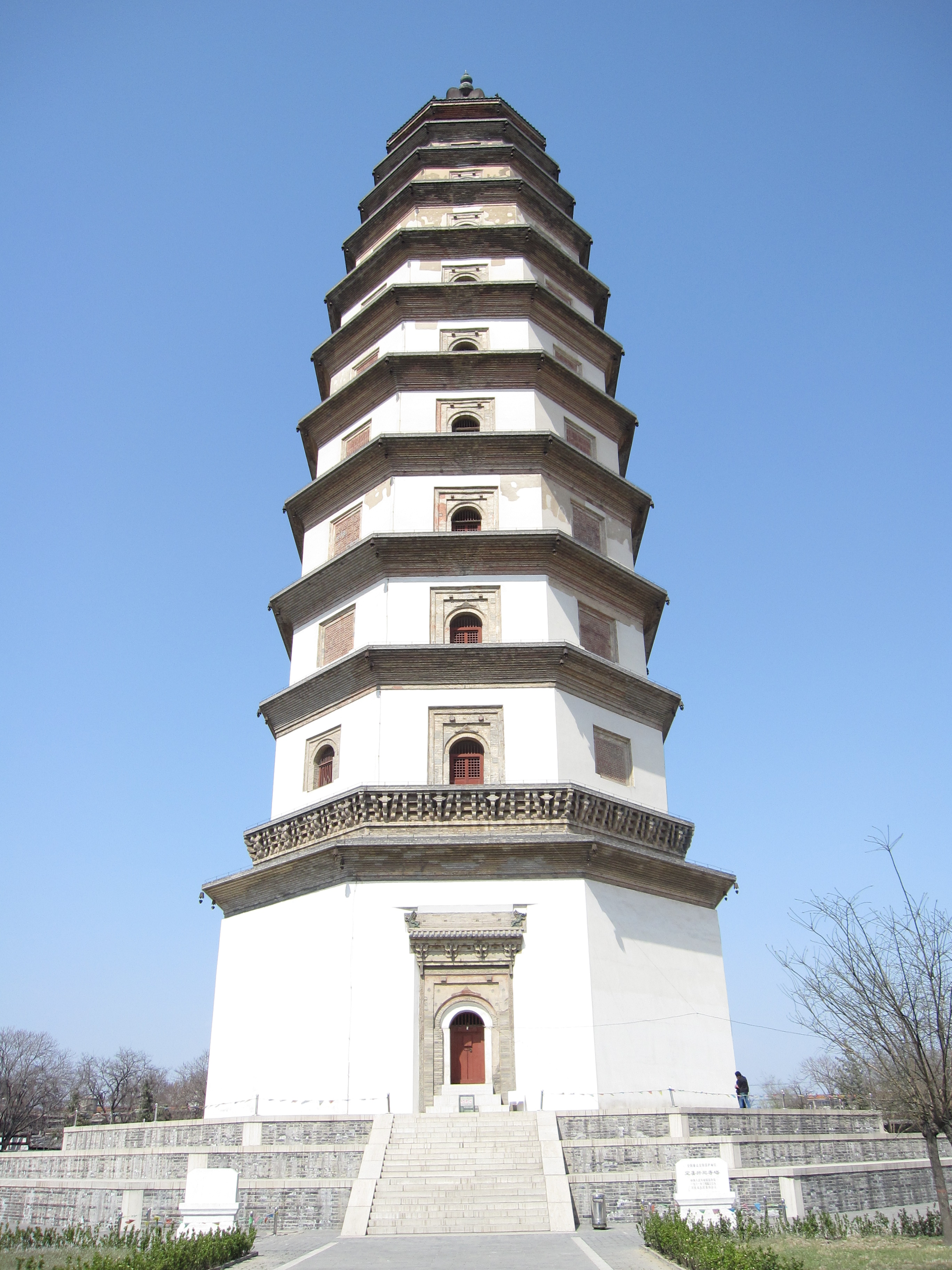
The Liaodi Pagoda, the tallest pre-modern Chinese pagoda, built in 1055; it was intended as a Buddhist religious structure, yet served a military purpose as a watchtower for observation of potential dangers.

Military strategy and military training were treated as sciences that could be studied and perfected; soldiers were tested in their skills of using weaponry and in their athletic ability. The troops were trained to follow signal standards to advance at the waving of banners and to halt at the sound of bells and drums.

The Song navy was of great importance during the consolidation of the empire in the 10th century; during the war against the Southern Tang state, the Song navy employed tactics such as defending large floating pontoon bridges across the Yangtze River in order to secure movements of troops and supplies. There were large ships in the Song navy that could carry 1,000 soldiers aboard their decks, while the swift-moving paddle-wheel craft were viewed as essential fighting ships in any successful naval battle.

In a battle on January 23, 971, massive arrow fire from Song dynasty crossbowmen decimated the war elephant corps of the Southern Han army. This defeat not only marked the eventual submission of the Southern Han to the Song dynasty, but also the last instance where a war elephant corps was employed as a regular division within a Chinese army.

There was a total of 347 military treatises written during the Song period, as listed by the history text of the Song Shi (compiled in 1345). However, only a handful of these military treatises have survived, which includes the Wujing Zongyao written in 1044. It was the first known book to have listed formulas for gunpowder; it gave appropriate formulas for use in several different kinds of gunpowder bombs. It also provided detailed descriptions and illustrations of double-piston pump flamethrowers, as well as instructions for the maintenance and repair of the components and equipment used in the device.

=== Arts, literature, philosophy, and religion ===
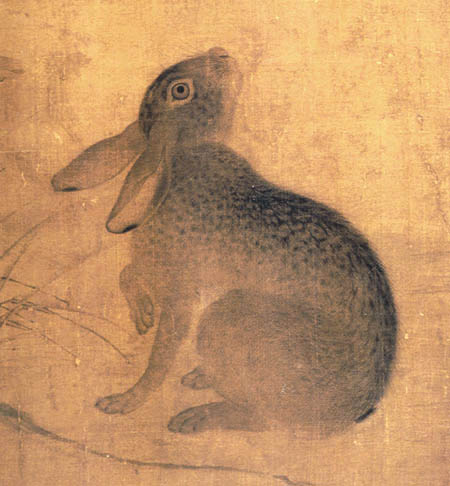
Close up on Double Happiness (Cui Bai). It was painted by Cui Bai, active during the reign of Shenzong. National Palace Museum

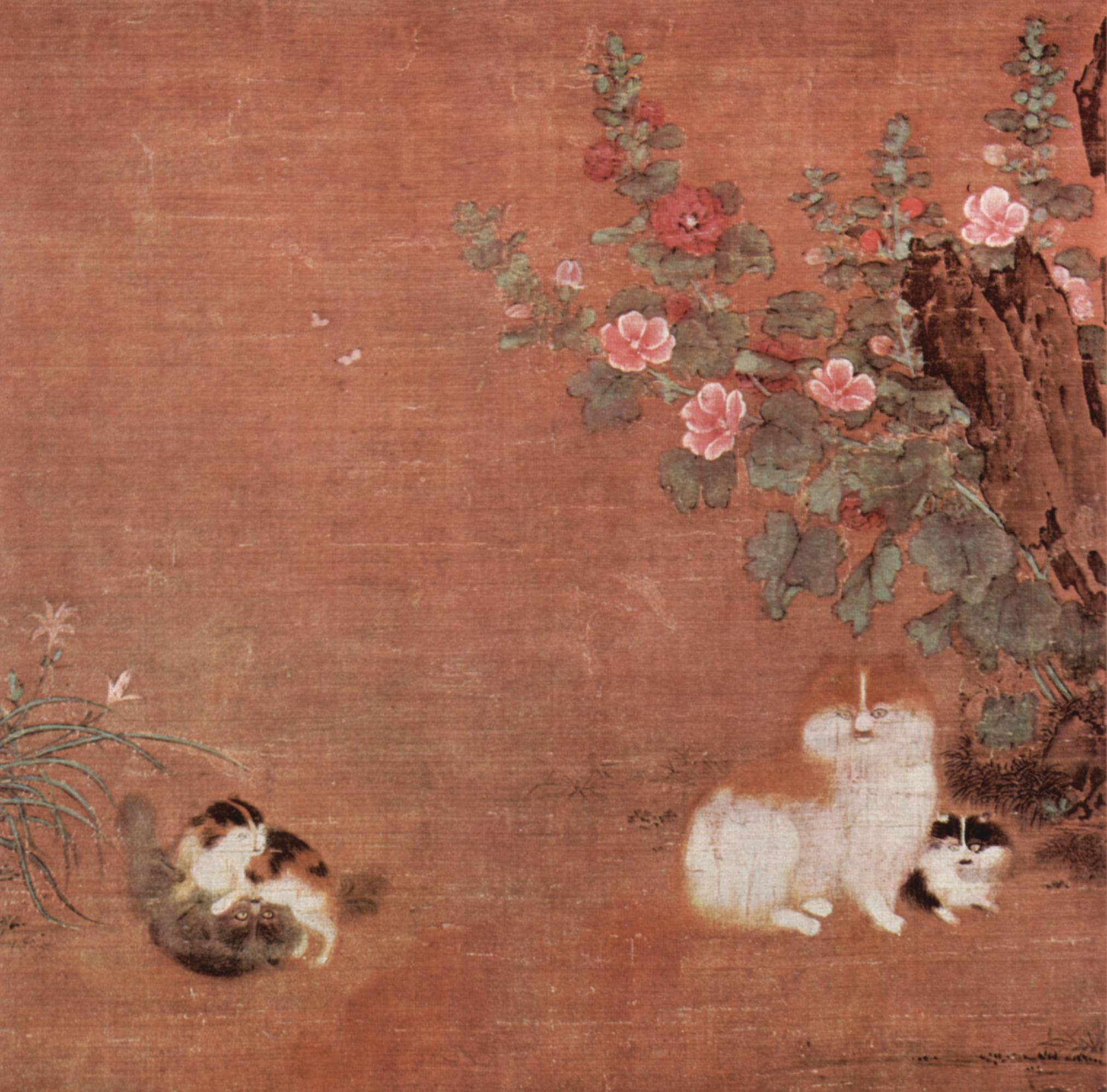
Cats in the Garden, by Mao Yi, 12th century.

The visual arts during the Song dynasty were heightened by new developments such as advances in landscape and portrait painting. The gentry elite engaged in the arts as accepted pastimes of the cultured scholar-official, including painting, composing poetry, writing calligraphy, and playing the guqin. The poet and statesman Su Shi and his associate Mi Fu (1051–1107) enjoyed antiquarian affairs, often borrowing or buying art pieces to study and copy. Poetry and literature profited from the rising popularity and development of the ci poetry form. Enormous encyclopedic volumes were compiled, such as works of historiography and dozens of treatises on technical subjects. This included the universal history text of the Zizhi Tongjian, compiled into 1000 volumes of 9.4 million written Chinese characters. The genre of Chinese travel literature also became popular with the writings of the geographer Fan Chengda (1126–1193) and Su Shi, the latter of whom wrote the 'daytrip essay' known as Record of Stone Bell Mountain that used persuasive writing to argue for a philosophical point. Although an early form of the local geographic gazetteer existed in China since the 1st century, the matured form known as "treatise on a place", or fangzhi, replaced the old "map guide", or transl. zho – transl. tujing, during the Song dynasty.

The imperial courts of the emperor's palace were filled with his entourage of court painters, calligraphers, poets, and storytellers. Emperor Huizong was the eighth emperor of the Song dynasty and he was a renowned artist as well as a patron of the art and the catalogue of his collection listed over 6,000 known paintings. A prime example of a highly venerated court painter was Zhang Zeduan (1085–1145) who painted an enormous panoramic painting, Along the River During the Qingming Festival. Emperor Gaozong of Song initiated a massive art project during his reign, known as the Eighteen Songs of a Nomad Flute from the life story of Cai Wenji (b. 177). This art project was a diplomatic gesture to the Jin dynasty while he negotiated for the release of his mother from Jurchen captivity in the north.

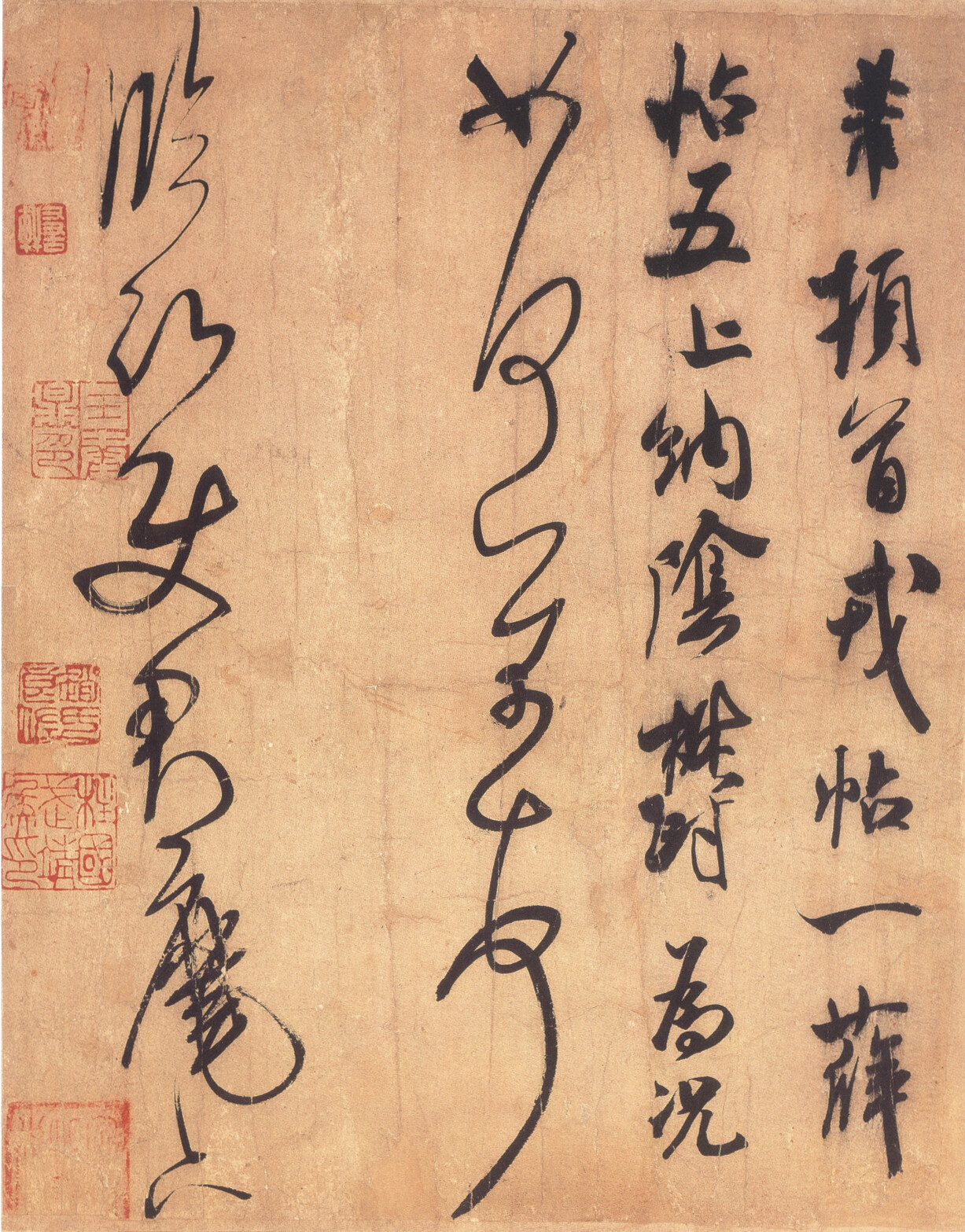
Chinese calligraphy of mixed styles written by Song dynasty poet Mi Fu (1051–1107)

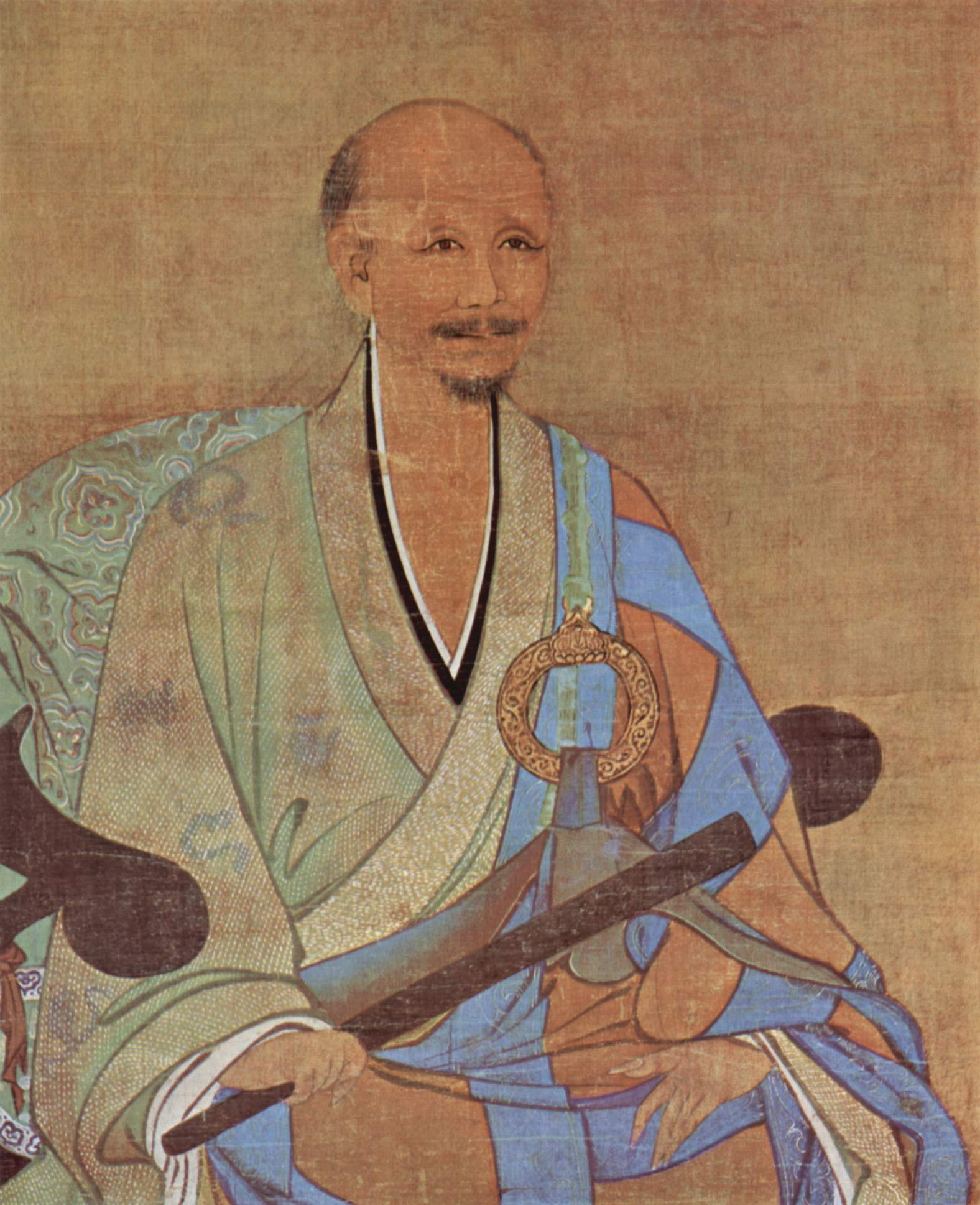
Portrait of the Chinese Zen Buddhist Wuzhun Shifan, painted in 1238 AD.

In philosophy, Chinese Buddhism had waned in influence but it retained its hold on the arts and on the charities of monasteries. Buddhism had a profound influence upon the budding movement of Neo-Confucianism, led by Cheng Yi (1033–1107) and Zhu Xi (1130–1200). Mahayana Buddhism influenced Fan Zhongyan and Wang Anshi through its concept of ethical universalism, while Buddhist metaphysics deeply affected the pre–Neo-Confucian doctrine of Cheng Yi. The philosophical work of Cheng Yi in turn influenced Zhu Xi. Although his writings were not accepted by his contemporary peers, Zhu's commentary and emphasis upon the Confucian classics of the Four Books as an introductory corpus to Confucian learning formed the basis of the Neo-Confucian doctrine. By the year 1241, under the sponsorship of Emperor Lizong, Zhu Xi's Four Books and his commentary on them became standard requirements of study for students attempting to pass the civil service examinations. The neighbouring countries of Japan and Korea also adopted Zhu Xi's teaching, known as the Shushigaku (朱子學, School of Zhu Xi) of Japan, and in Korea the Jujahak (주자학). Buddhism's continuing influence can be seen in painted artwork such as Lin Tinggui's Luohan Laundering. However, the ideology was highly criticized and even scorned by some. The statesman and historian Ouyang Xiu (1007–1072) called the religion a "curse" that could only be remedied by uprooting it from Chinese culture and replacing it with Confucian discourse. The Chan sect experienced a literary flourishing in the Song period, which saw the publication of several major classical koan collections which remain influential in Zen philosophy and practice to the present day. A true revival of Buddhism in Chinese society would not occur until the Mongol rule of the Yuan dynasty, with Kublai Khan's sponsorship of Tibetan Buddhism and Drogön Chögyal Phagpa as the leading lama. The Christian sect of Nestorianism, which had entered China in the Tang era, would also be revived in China under Mongol rule.

=== Clothing ===
Clothing styles and traditions varied from social class and with seasonal changes. Silk was the preferred fabric worn by the wealthy. Clothing worn by commoners were usually made of hemp, though cotton was more widely used in Southern China, and was largely restricted to a standard color of black and white.

Trousers were the acceptable attire for peasants, soldiers, artisans, and merchants, although wealthy merchants might choose to wear more ornate clothing and male blouses that came down below the waist. Acceptable apparel for scholar-officials was rigidly defined by the social ranking system. However, as time went on this rule of rank-graded apparel for officials was not as strictly enforced. Each official was able to display his awarded status by wearing different-colored traditional silken robes that hung to the ground around his feet, specific types of headgear, and even specific styles of girdles that displayed his graded-rank of officialdom.

Women wore long dresses, blouses that came down to the knee, skirts, and jackets with long or short sleeves, while women from wealthy families could wear purple scarves around their shoulders. The main difference in women's apparel from that of men was that it was fastened on the left, not on the right.

=== Cuisine ===
The main food staples in the diet of the lower classes remained rice, pork, and salted fish. In 1011, Emperor Zhenzong of Song introduced Champa rice to China from Vietnam's Kingdom of Champa, which sent 30,000 bushels as a tribute to Song. Champa rice was drought-resistant and able to grow fast enough to offer two harvests a year instead of one.

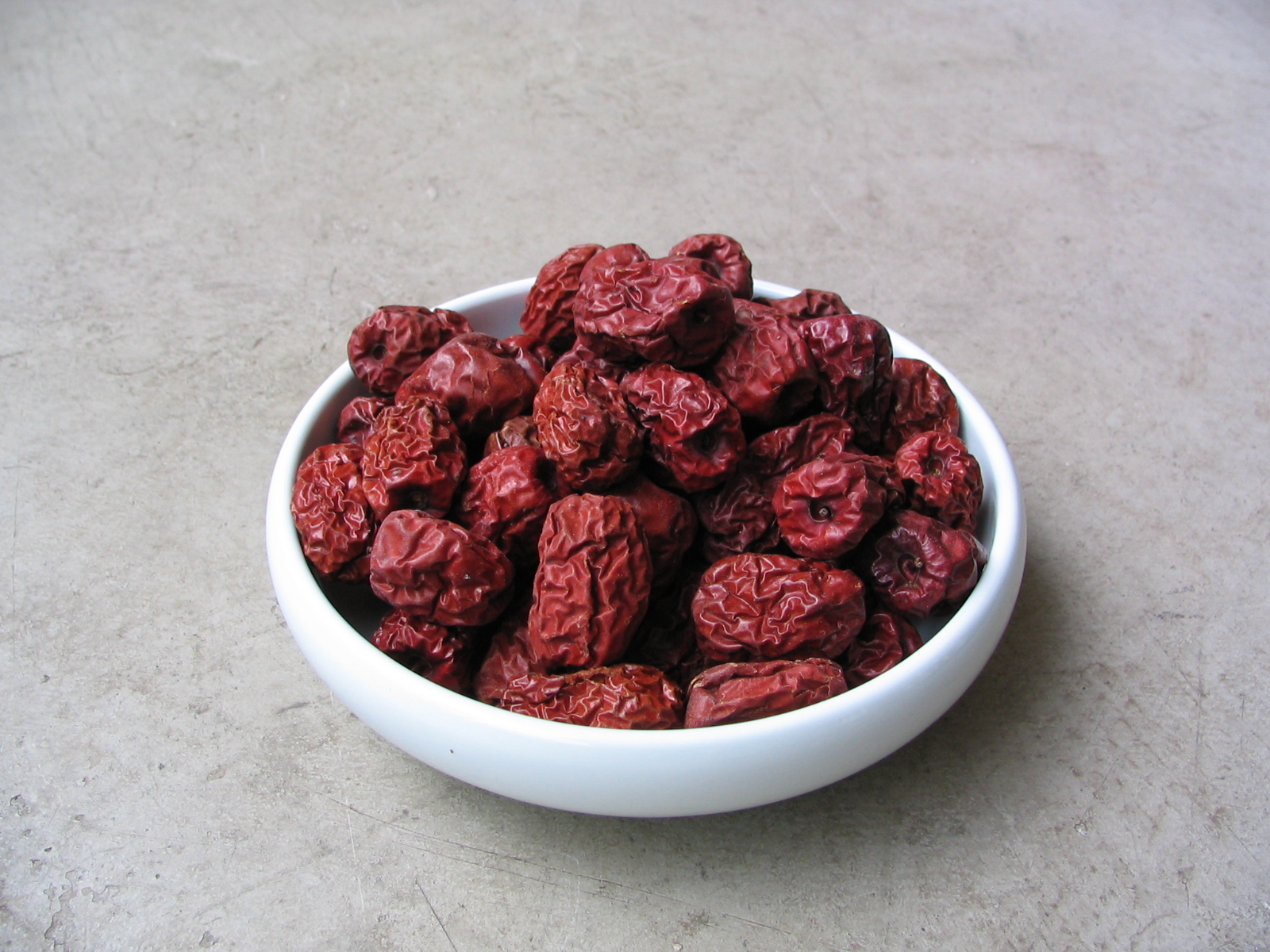
Dried jujubes such as these were imported to Song China from South Asia and the Middle East.

Song restaurant and tavern menus are recorded. They list entrees for feasts, banquets, festivals, and carnivals. They reveal a diverse and lavish diet for those of the upper class. They could choose from a wide variety of meats and seafood, including shrimp, geese, duck, mussel, shellfish, fallow deer, hare, partridge, pheasant, francolin, quail, fox, badger, clam, crab, and many others. Dairy products were rare in Chinese cuisine at this time. Beef was rarely consumed since the bull was a valuable draft animal, and dog meat was absent from the diet of the wealthy, although the poor could choose to eat dog meat if necessary (yet it was not part of their regular diet). People also consumed dates, raisins, jujubes, pears, plums, apricots, pear juice, lychee-fruit juice, honey and ginger drinks, spices and seasonings of Sichuan pepper, ginger, soy sauce, vegetable oil, sesame oil, salt, and vinegar.

== Economy ==
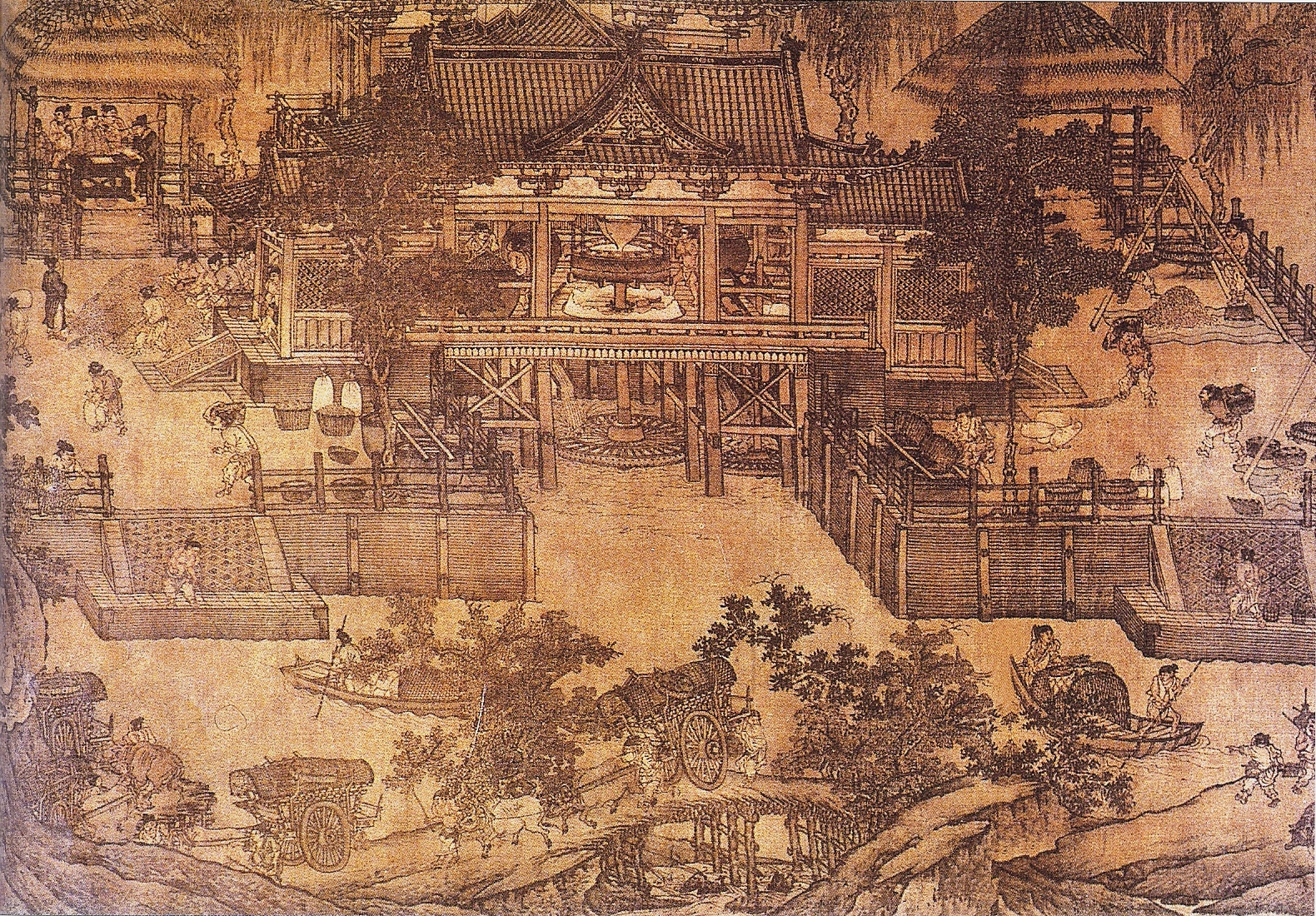
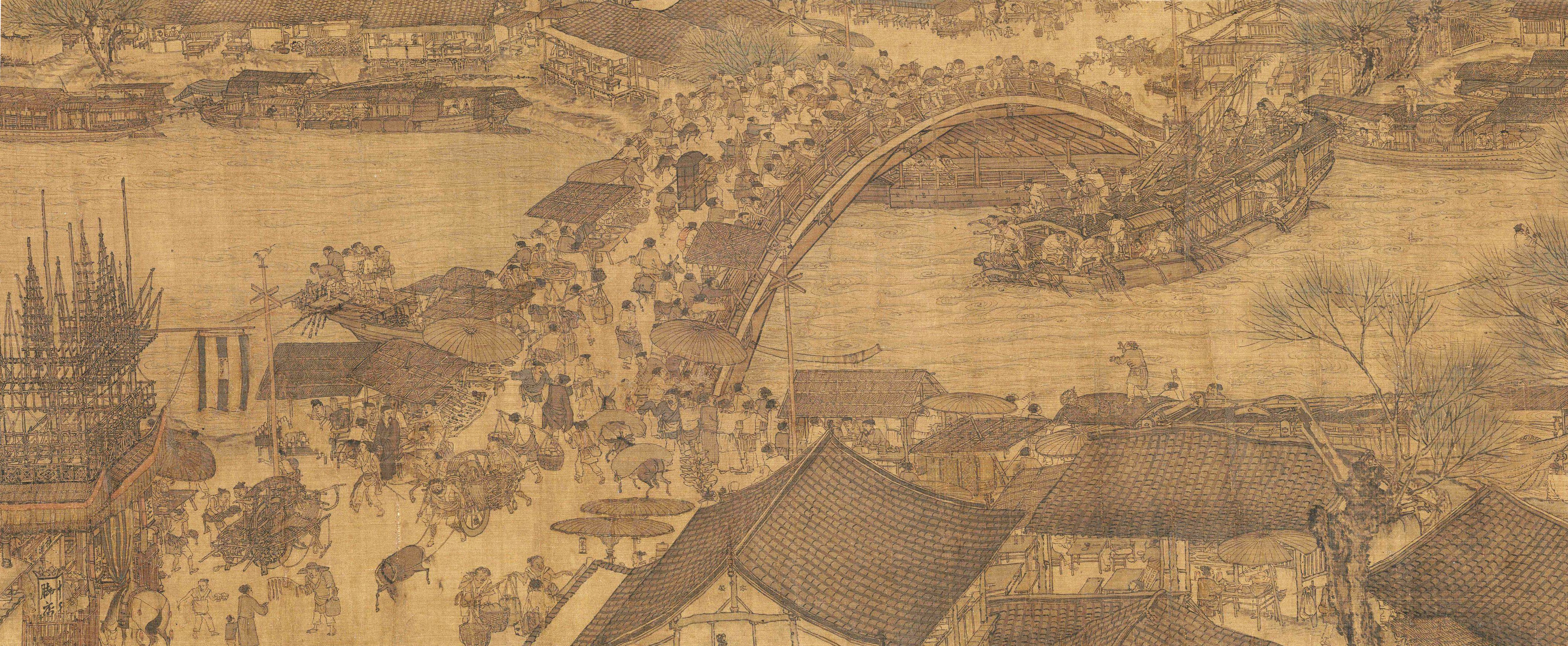
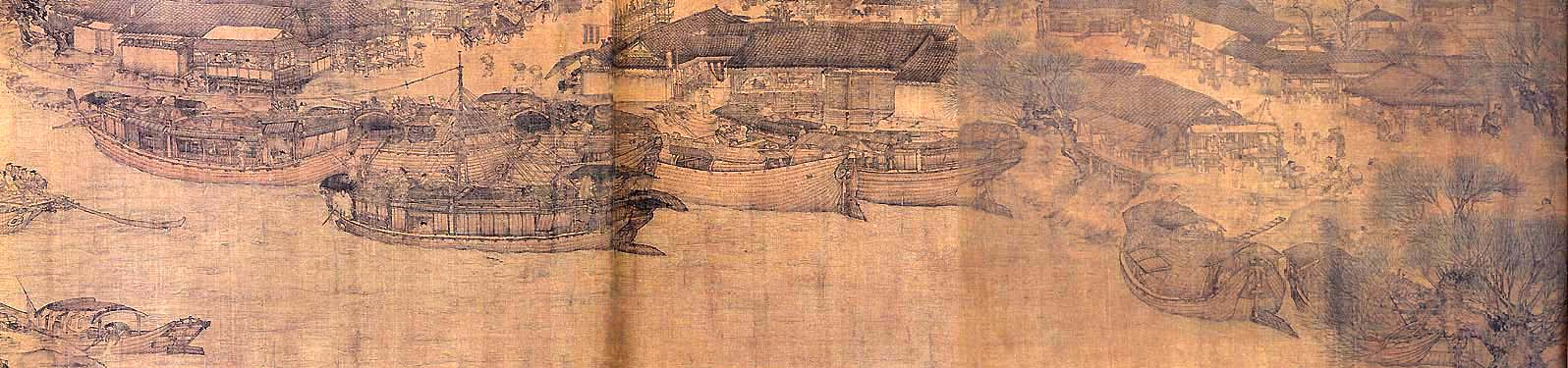
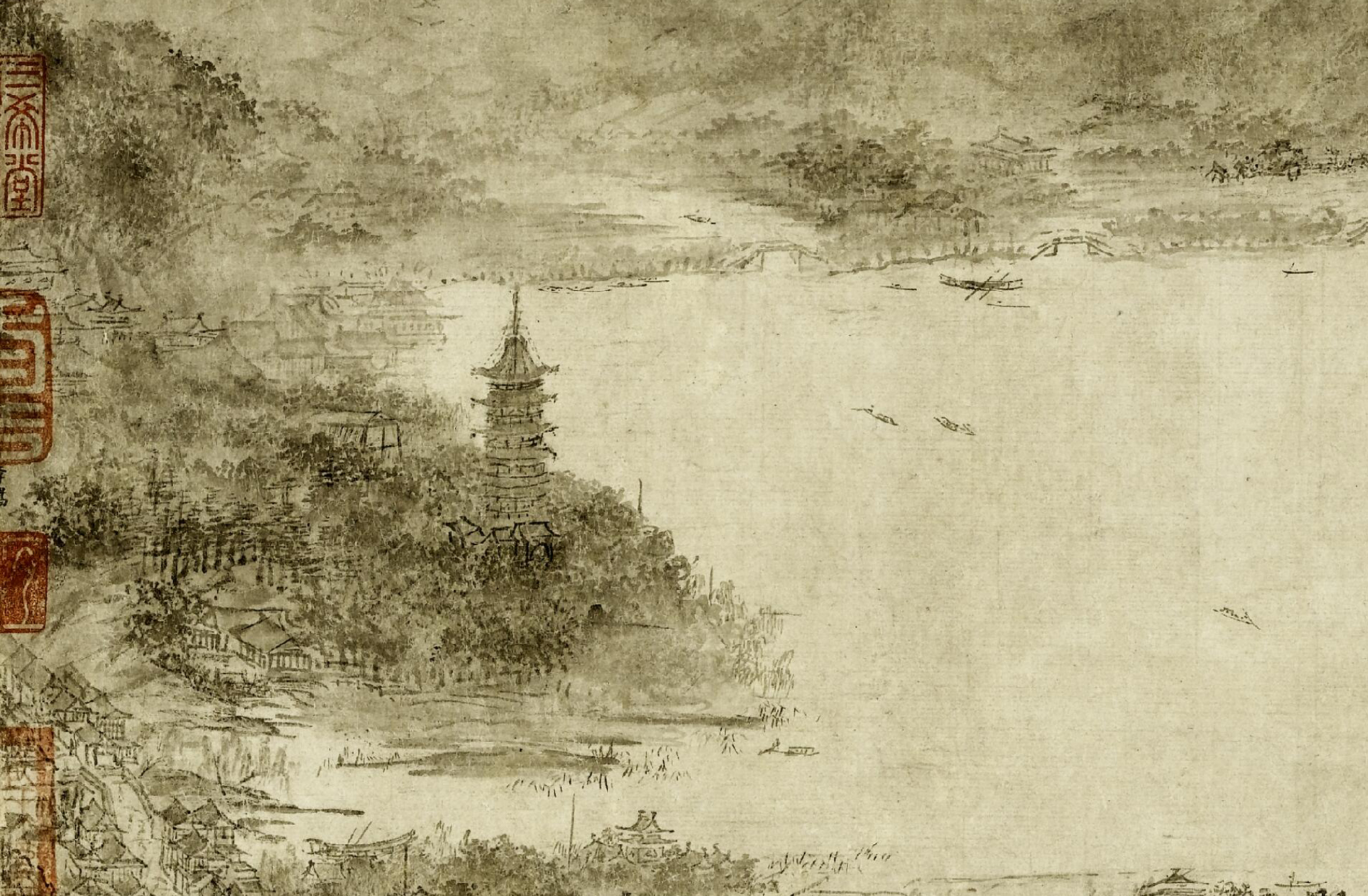
City views of the Song dynasty from paintings. Clockwise from upper left: A Northern Song dynasty (960–1127) era Chinese painting of a water-powered mill for grain, with surrounding river transport. The bridge scene from Zhang Zeduan's (1085–1145) painting Along the River During Qingming Festival. Ships depicted in Along the River During Qingming Festival. Leifeng Pagoda during the Southern Song dynasty by Li Song.

The Song dynasty had one of the most prosperous and advanced economies in the medieval world. Song Chinese invested their funds in joint stock companies and in multiple sailing vessels at a time when monetary gain was assured from the vigorous overseas trade and domestic trade along the Grand Canal and Yangtze River. Both private and government-controlled industries met the needs of a growing Chinese population in the Song; prominent merchant families and private businesses were allowed to occupy industries that were not already government-operated monopolies. Artisans and merchants formed guilds that the state had to deal with when assessing taxes, requisitioning goods, and setting standard workers' wages and prices on goods.

The iron industry was pursued by both private entrepreneurs who owned their own smelters as well as government-supervised smelting facilities. The Song economy was stable enough to produce over 100,000,000 kg (220,000,000 lb) of iron products per year. Large-scale deforestation would have continued if not for the 11th-century innovation of the use of coal instead of charcoal in blast furnaces for smelting cast iron. Much of this iron was reserved for military use in crafting weapons and armouring troops, but some was used to fashion the many iron products needed to fill the demands of the growing domestic market. The iron trade within China was advanced by the construction of new canals, facilitating the flow of iron products from production centres to the large market in the capital city.

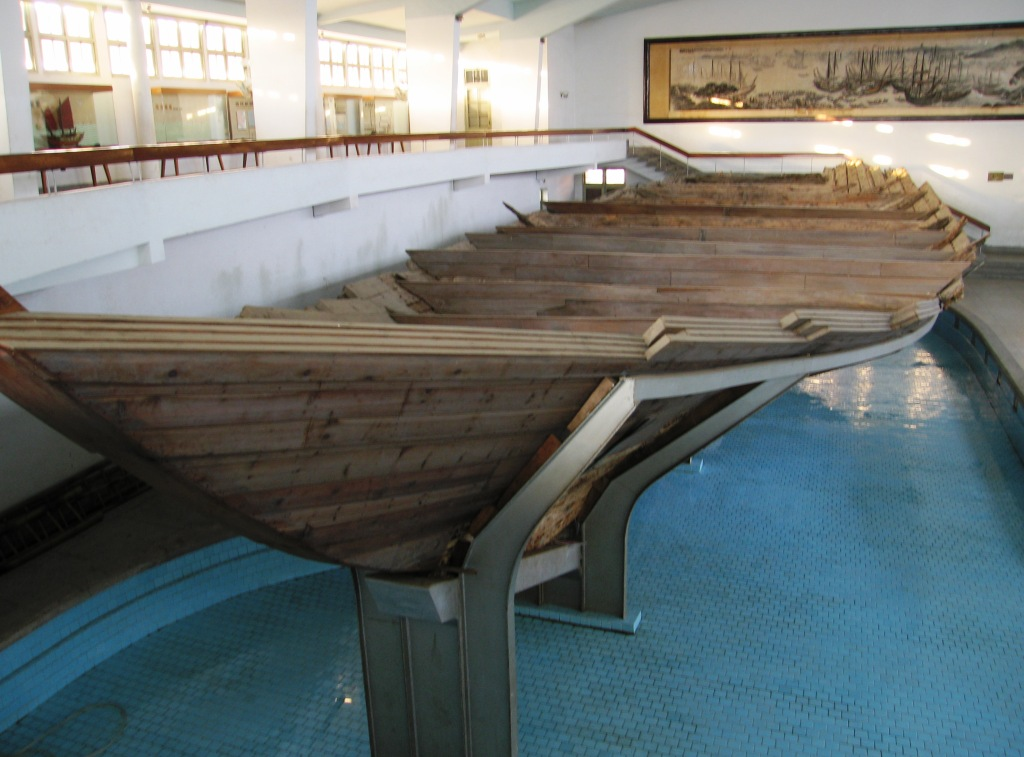
Junks from the 13th century featured hulls with watertight compartments.

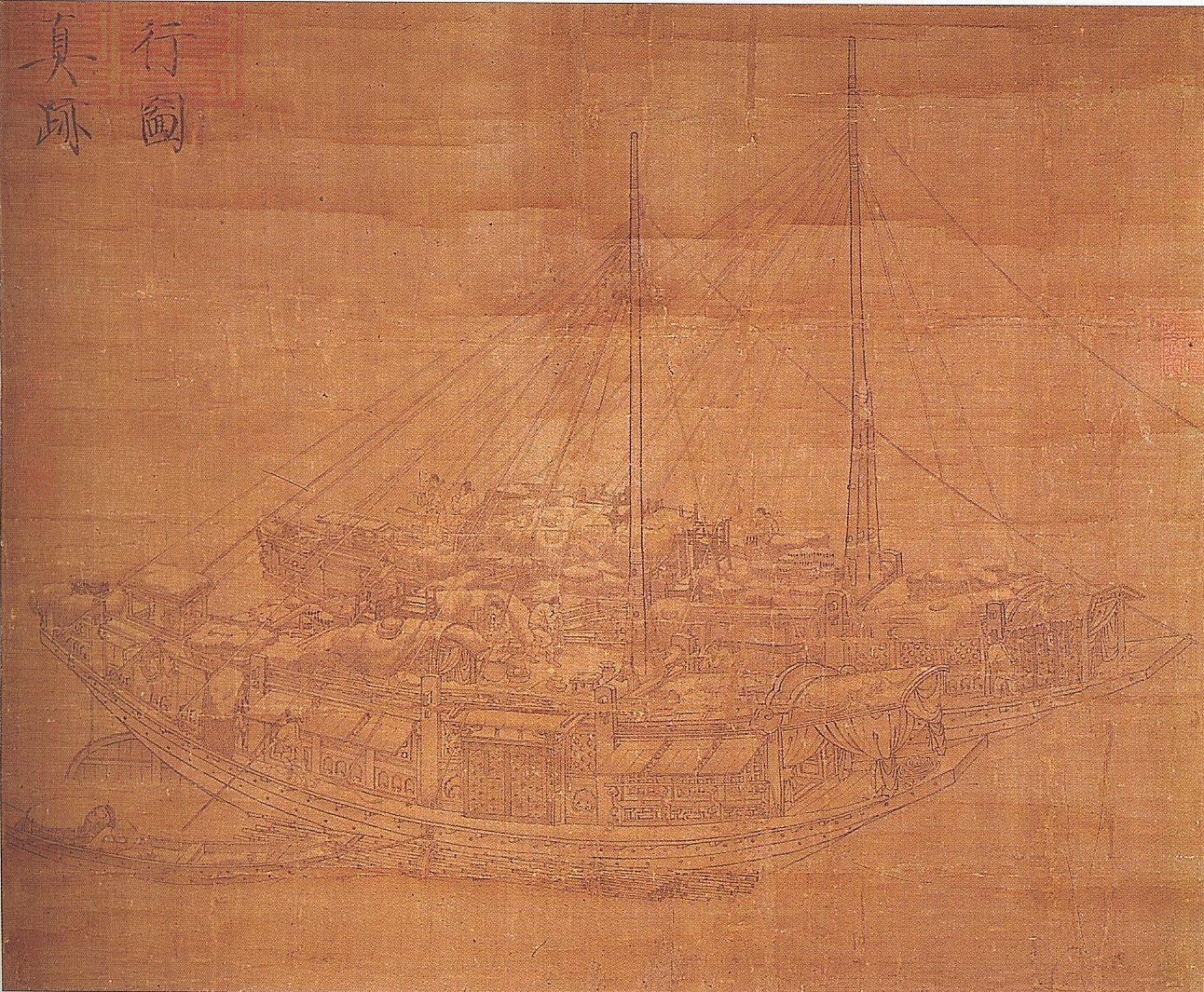
A painting shows a pair of cargo ships with stern-mounted rudders accompanied by a smaller craft.

The annual output of minted copper currency in 1085 reached roughly six billion coins. The most notable advancement in the Song economy was the establishment of the world's first government issued paper-printed money, known as Jiaozi (see also Huizi). For the printing of paper money, the Song court established several government-run factories in the cities of Huizhou, Chengdu, Hangzhou, and Anqi. The size of the workforce employed in paper money factories was large; it was recorded in 1175 that the factory at Hangzhou employed more than a thousand workers a day.

The economic power of Song China can be attested by the growth of the urban population of its capital city Hangzhou. The population was 200,000 at the start of the 12th century and increased to 500,000 around 1170 and doubled to over a million a century later. This economic power also heavily influenced foreign economies abroad. In 1120 alone, the Song government collected 18,000,000 ounces (510,000 kg) of silver in taxes. The Moroccan geographer al-Idrisi wrote in 1154 of the prowess of Chinese merchant ships in the Indian Ocean and of their annual voyages that brought iron, swords, silk, velvet, porcelain, and various textiles to places such as Aden (Yemen), the Indus River, and the Euphrates. Foreigners, in turn, affected the Chinese economy. For example, many West and Central Asian Muslims went to China to trade, becoming a preeminent force in the import and export industry, while some were even appointed as officers supervising economic affairs. Sea trade with the South-west Pacific, the Hindu world, the Islamic world, and East Africa brought merchants great fortune and spurred an enormous growth in the shipbuilding industry of Song-era Fujian. However, there was risk involved in such long overseas ventures. In order to reduce the risk of losing money on maritime trade missions abroad, wrote historians Ebrey, Walthall, and Palais:

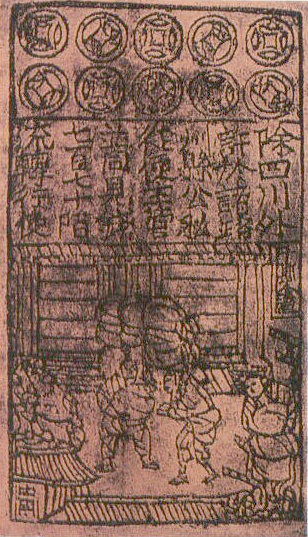
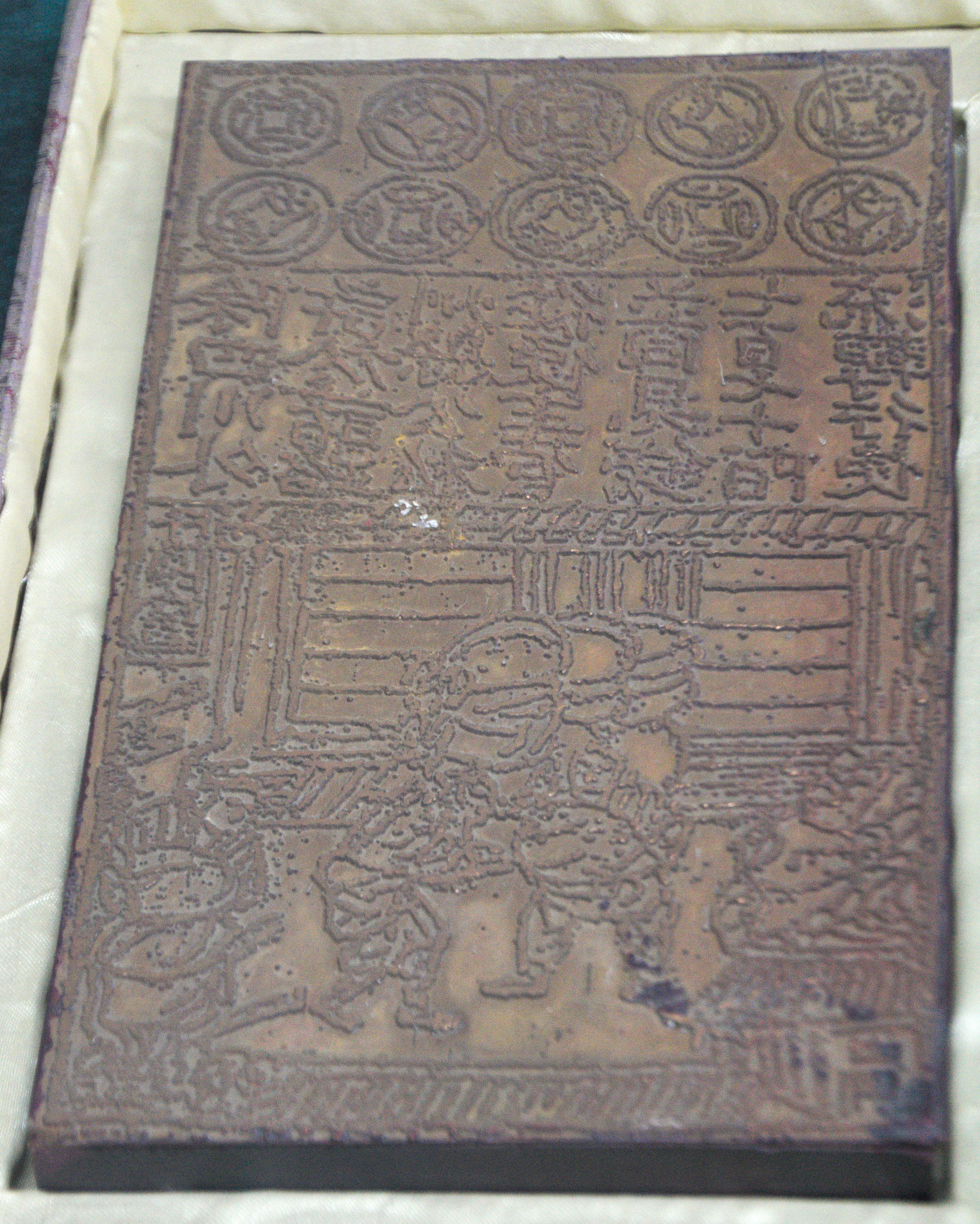
Jiaozi and corresponding printing plate. The Jiaozi was a form of promissory banknote which appeared around the 11th century in the Sichuan capital of Chengdu, China. Numismatists regard it as the first paper money in history.

[Song era] investors usually divided their investment among many ships, and each ship had many investors behind it. One observer thought eagerness to invest in overseas trade was leading to an outflow of copper cash. He wrote, "People along the coast are on intimate terms with the merchants who engage in overseas trade, either because they are fellow-countrymen or personal acquaintances. ... [They give the merchants] money to take with them on their ships for purchase and return conveyance of foreign goods. They invest from ten to a hundred strings of cash, and regularly make profits of several hundred percent".

== Science and technology ==
=== Gunpowder warfare ===
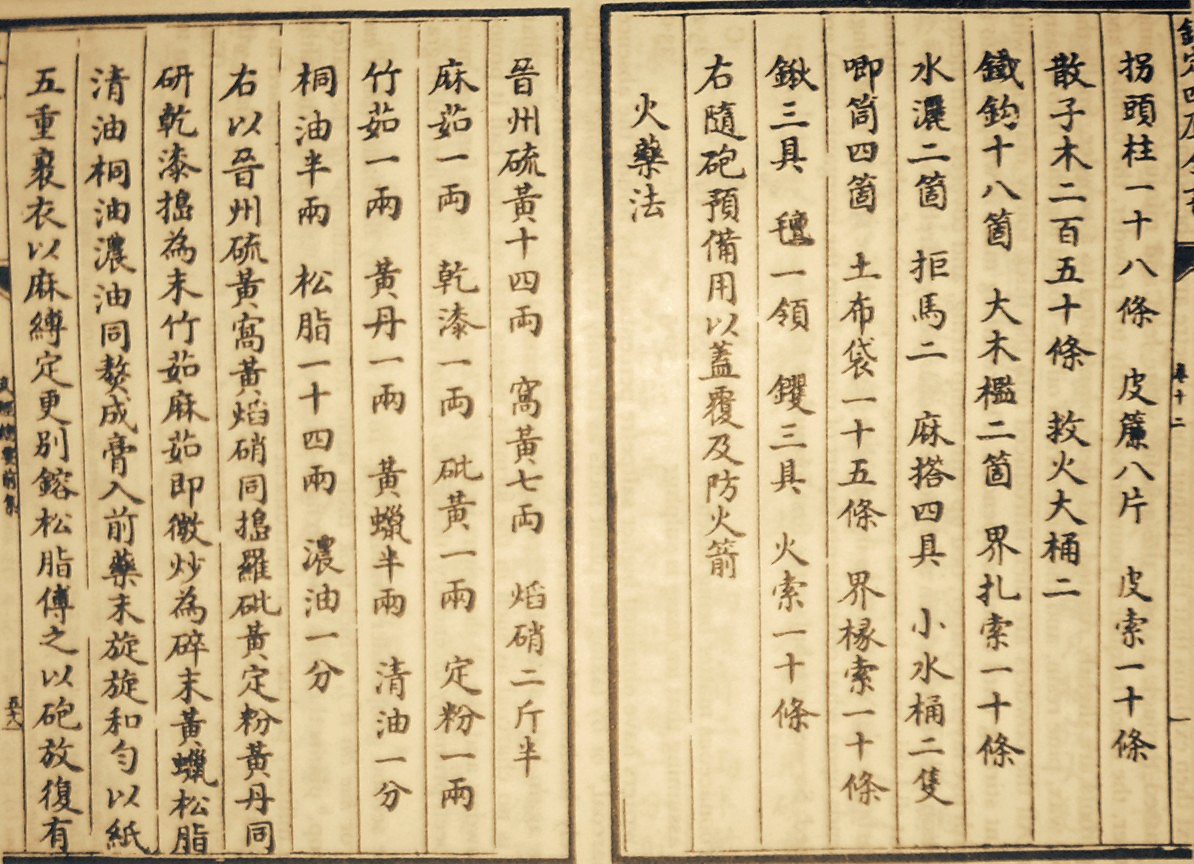
Earliest known written formula for gunpowder from the Wujing Zongyao (1044)

Advancements in weapons technology enhanced by gunpowder, including the evolution of the early flamethrower, explosive grenades, firearms, cannons, and land mines, enabled the Song Chinese to ward off their militant enemies until the Song's ultimate collapse in the late 13th century. The Wujing Zongyao manuscript of 1044 was the first book in history to provide formulas for gunpowder and their specified use in different types of bombs. While engaged in a war with the Mongols, in 1259 the official Li Zengbo wrote in his Kezhai Zagao, Xugaohou that the city of Qingzhou was manufacturing one to two thousand strong iron-cased bombshells a month, dispatching to Xiangyang and Yingzhou about ten to twenty thousand such bombs at a time. In turn, the invading Mongols employed northern Chinese soldiers and used these same types of gunpowder weapons against the Song. By the 14th century the firearm and cannon could also be found in Europe, India, and the Middle East, during the early age of gunpowder warfare.

=== Measuring distance and mechanical navigation ===
As early as the Han dynasty, when the state needed to accurately measure distances traveled throughout the empire, the Chinese relied on a mechanical odometer. The Chinese odometer was a wheeled carriage, its gearwork being driven by the rotation of the carriage's wheels; specific units of distance—the Chinese li—were marked by the mechanical striking of a drum or bell as an auditory signal. The specifications for the 11th-century odometer were written by Chief Chamberlain Lu Daolong, who is quoted extensively in the historical text of the Song Shi (compiled by 1345). In the Song period, the odometer vehicle was also combined with another old complex mechanical device known as the south-pointing chariot. This device, originally crafted by Ma Jun in the 3rd century, incorporated a differential gear that allowed a figure mounted on the vehicle to always point in the southern direction, no matter how the vehicle's wheels turned about. The concept of the differential gear that was used in this navigational vehicle is now found in modern automobiles in order to apply an equal amount of torque to a car's wheels even when they are rotating at different speeds.

=== Polymaths, inventions, and astronomy ===
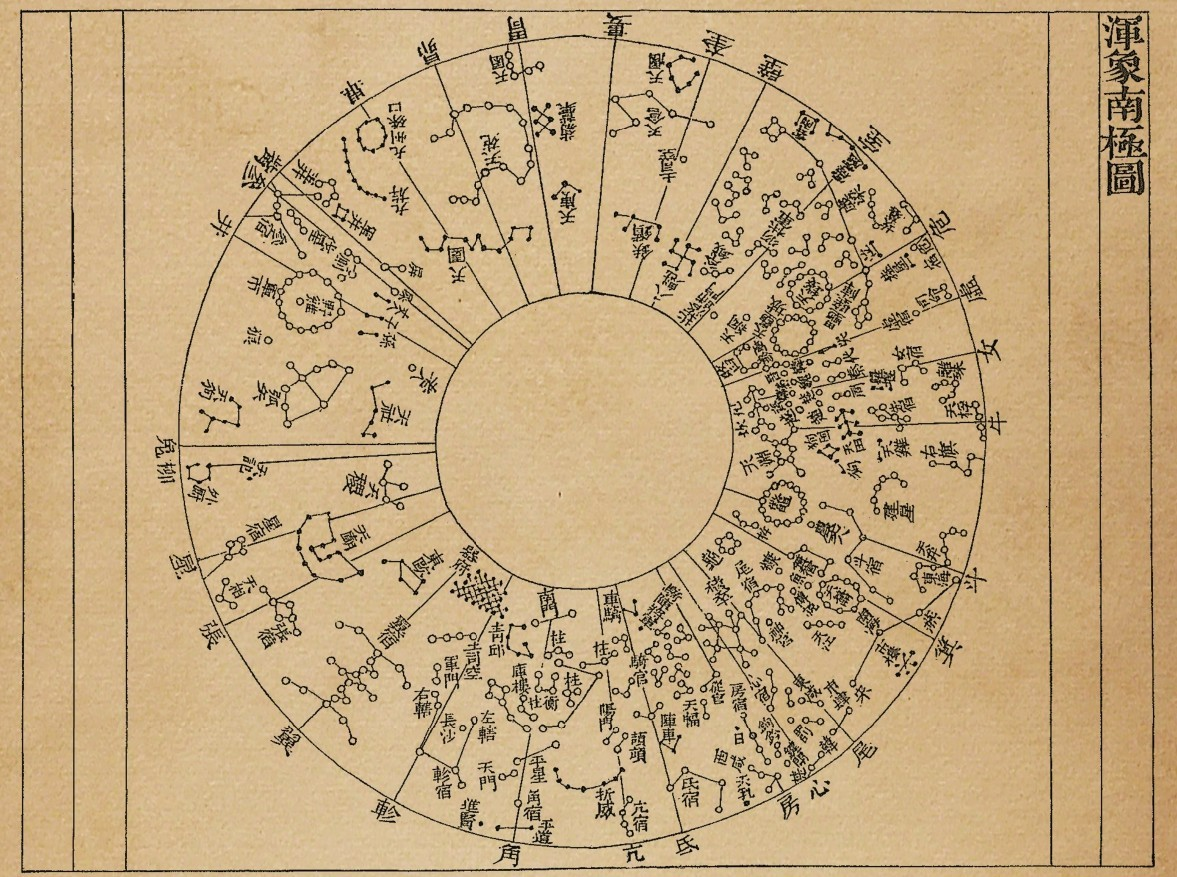
Star map of the south polar projection for Su's celestial globe, Xin Yi Xiang Fa Yao, 1092

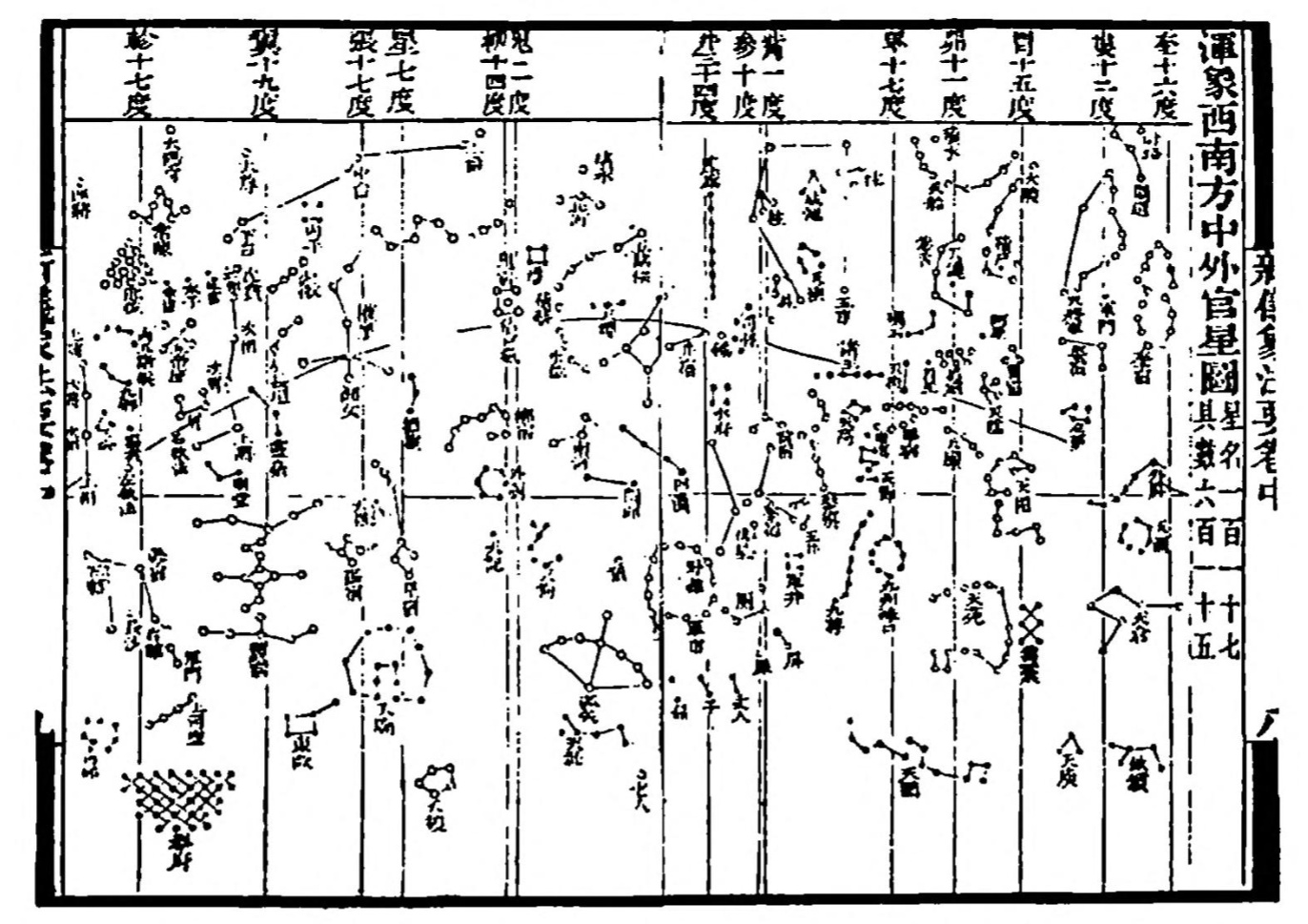
One of the star charts from Su Song's Xin Yi Xiang Fa Yao published in 1092, featuring cylindrical projection similar to Mercator projection and the corrected position of the pole star thanks to Shen Kuo's astronomical observations. Su Song's celestial atlas of five star maps is actually the oldest in printed form.

Polymaths such as the scientists and statesmen Shen Kuo (1031–1095) and Su Song (1020–1101) embodied advancements in all fields of study, including botany, zoology, geology, mineralogy, metallurgy, mechanics, magnetics, meteorology, horology, astronomy, pharmaceutical medicine, archeology, mathematics, cartography, optics, art criticism, hydraulics, and many other fields.

Shen Kuo was the first to discern magnetic declination of true north while experimenting with a compass. Shen theorized that geographical climates gradually shifted over time. He created a theory of land formation involving concepts accepted in modern geomorphology. He performed optical experiments with camera obscura just decades after Ibn al-Haytham was the first to do so. He also improved the designs of astronomical instruments such as the widened astronomical sighting tube, which allowed Shen Kuo to fix the position of the pole star (which had shifted over centuries of time). Shen Kuo was also known for hydraulic clockworks, as he invented a new overflow-tank clepsydra which had more efficient higher-order interpolation instead of linear interpolation in calibrating the measure of time.

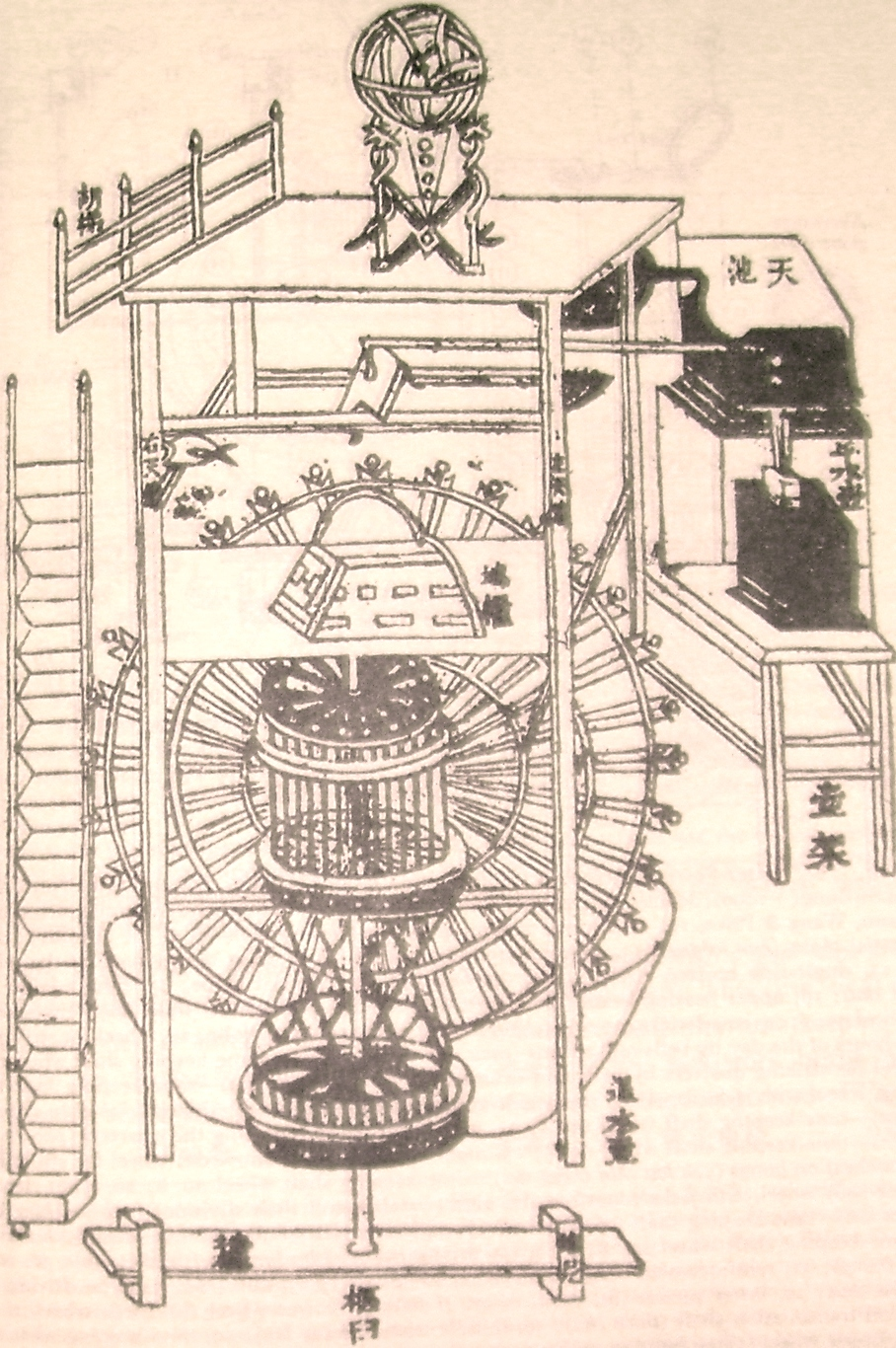
An interior diagram of the astronomical clock tower of Kaifeng featured in Su Song's book, written by 1092 and published in print by 1094.

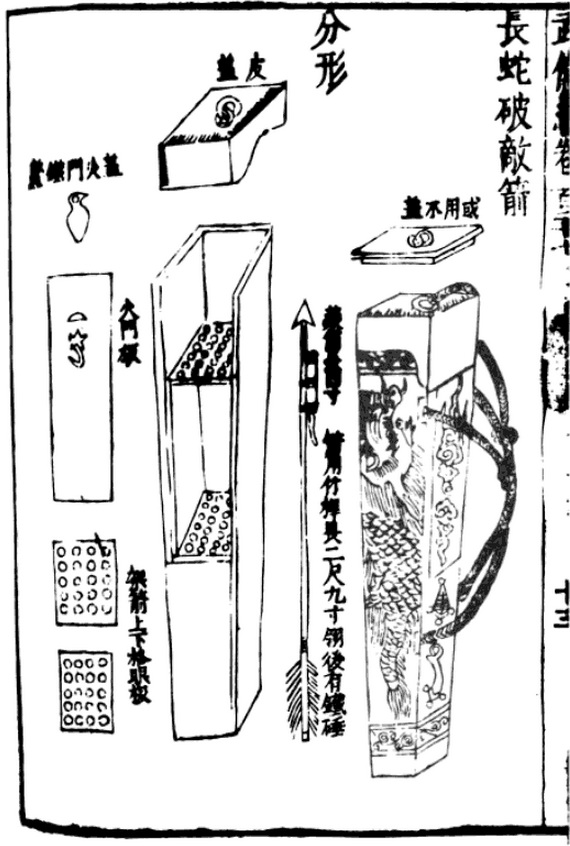
A depiction of the 13th century "long serpent" rocket launcher. The holes in the frame are designed to keep the rockets separate, from the 1510 edition of Wujing Zongyao.

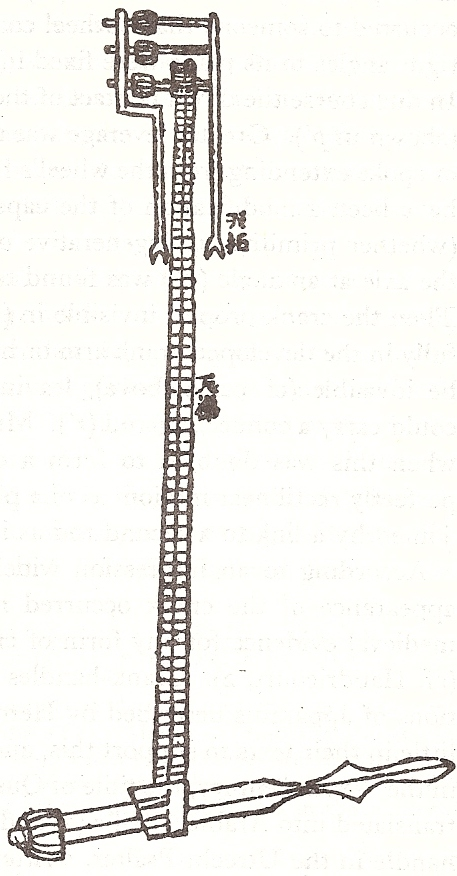
The oldest known illustration of an endless power-transmitting chain drive. It was used for coupling the main driving shaft of the Kaifeng clock tower to the armillary sphere gear box.

Su Song was best known for his horology treatise written in 1092, which described and illustrated in great detail his hydraulic-powered, 12 m (39 ft) tall astronomical clock tower built in Kaifeng. The clock tower featured large astronomical instruments of the armillary sphere and celestial globe, both driven by an early intermittently working escapement mechanism (similarly to the western verge escapement of true mechanical clocks appeared in medieval clockworks, derived from ancient clockworks of classical times). Su's tower featured a rotating gear wheel with 133 clock jack mannequins who were timed to rotate past shuttered windows while ringing gongs and bells, banging drums, and presenting announcement plaques. In his printed book, Su published a celestial atlas of five star charts. These star charts feature a cylindrical projection similar to Mercator projection, the latter being a cartographic innovation of Gerardus Mercator in 1569.

The Song Chinese observed supernovae, including SN 1054, the remnants of which would form the Crab Nebula. Moreover, the Soochow Astronomical Chart on Chinese planispheres was prepared in 1193 for instructing the crown prince on astronomical findings. The planispheres were engraved in stone several decades later.

=== Mathematics and cartography ===
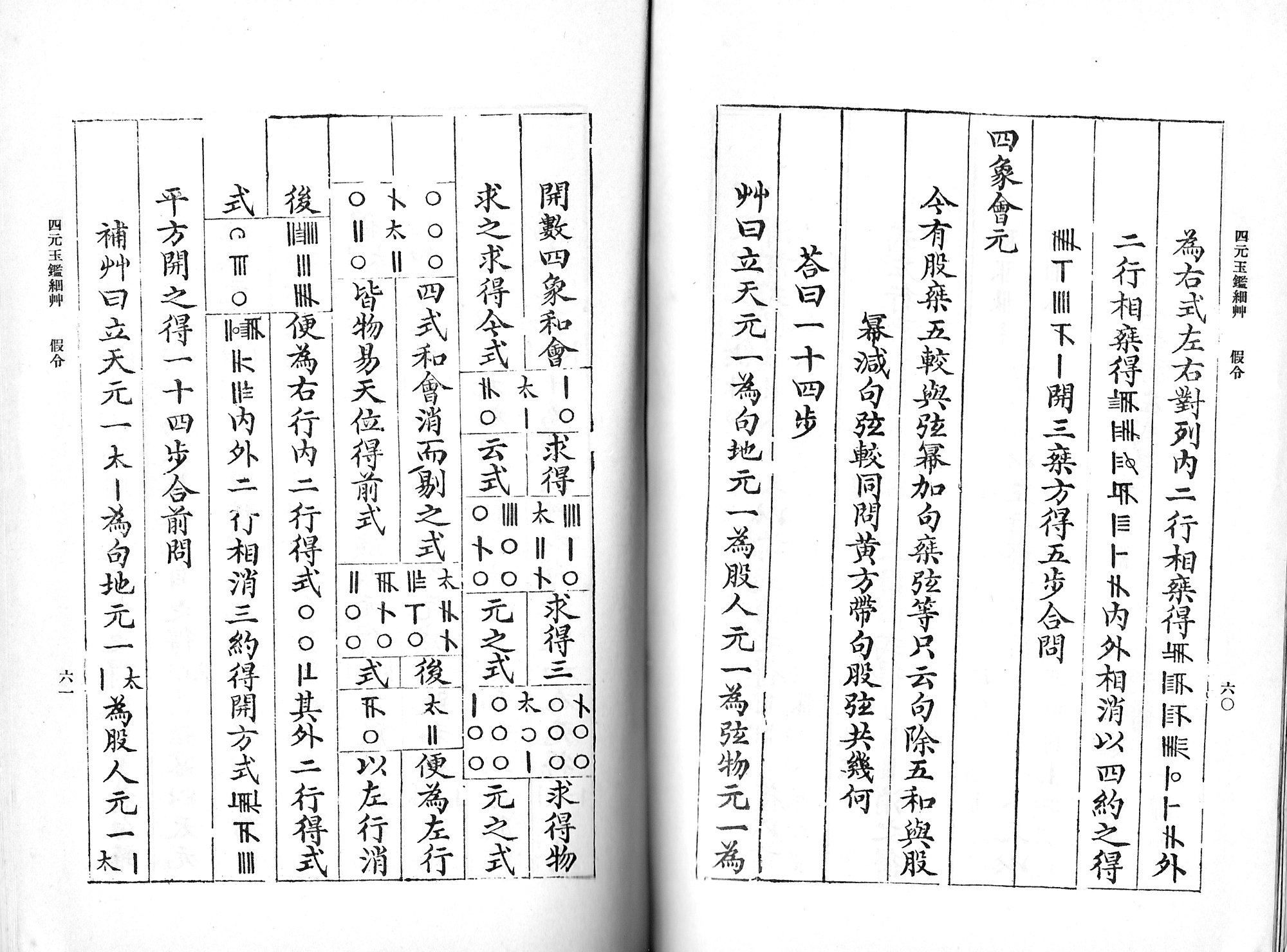
Facsimile of Zhu Shijie's Jade Mirror of Four Unknowns

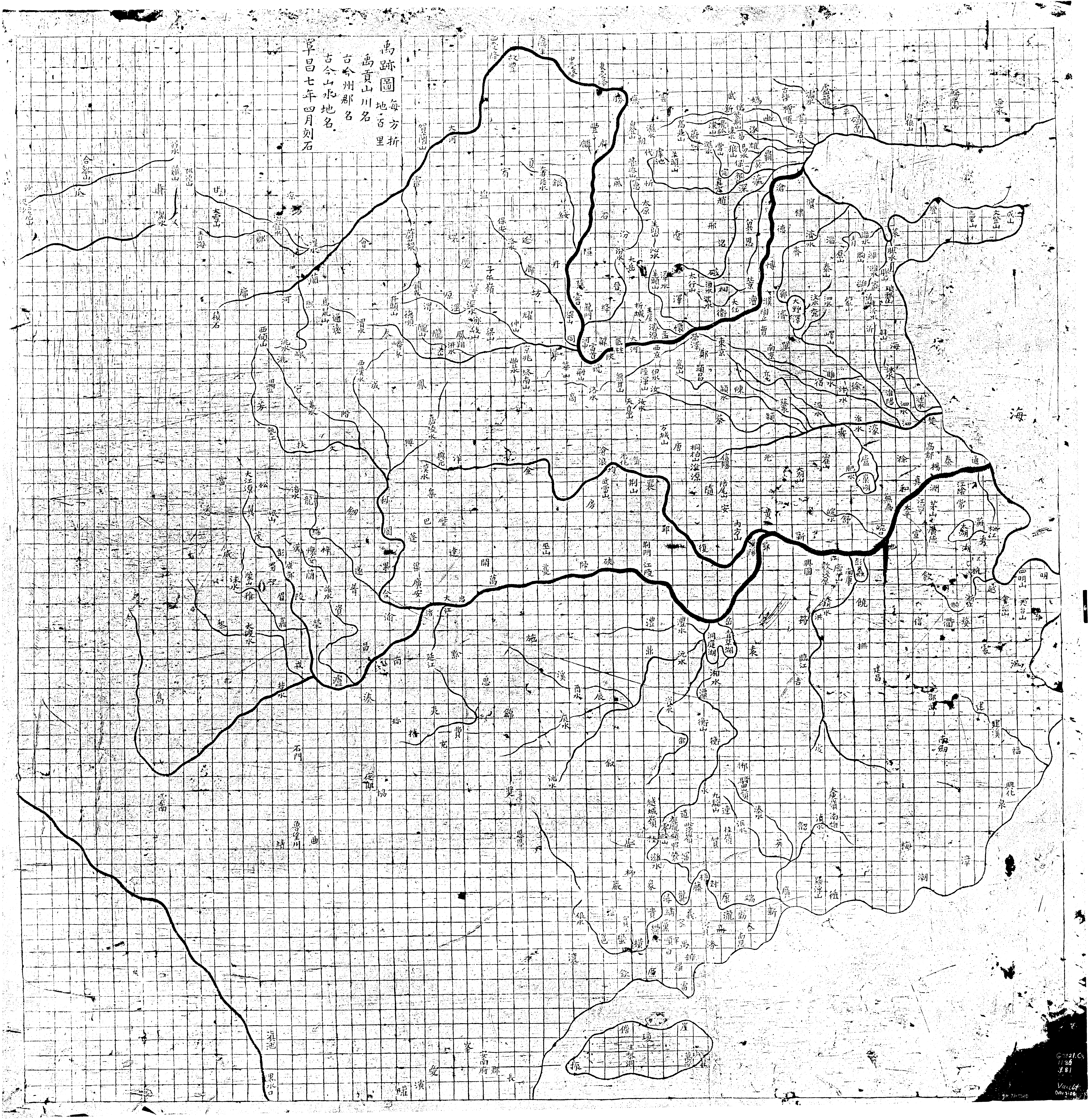
The Yu Ji Tu, or "Map of the Tracks of Yu", carved into stone in 1137, located in the Stele Forest of Xi'an. This 3 ft (0.91 m) squared map features a graduated scale of 100 li for each rectangular grid. China's coastline and river systems are clearly defined and precisely pinpointed on the map. Yu refers to the Chinese deity described in the geographical chapter of the Book of Documents, dated 5th–3rd centuries BCE.

There were many notable improvements to Chinese mathematics during the Song era. Mathematician Yang Hui's 1261 book provided the earliest Chinese illustration of Pascal's triangle, although it had earlier been described by Jia Xian in around 1100. Yang Hui also provided rules for constructing combinatorial arrangements in magic squares, provided theoretical proof for Euclid's forty-third proposition about parallelograms, and was the first to use negative coefficients of 'x' in quadratic equations. Yang's contemporary Qin Jiushao (c. 1202–1261) was the first to introduce the zero symbol into Chinese mathematics; before this blank spaces were used instead of zeroes in the system of counting rods. He is also known for working with the Chinese remainder theorem, Heron's formula, and astronomical data used in determining the winter solstice. Qin's major work was the Mathematical Treatise in Nine Sections published in 1247.

Geometry was essential to surveying and cartography. The earliest extant Chinese maps date to the 4th century BCE, yet it was not until the time of Pei Xiu (224–271) that topographical elevation, a formal rectangular grid system, and use of a standard graduated scale of distances was applied to terrain maps. Following a long tradition, Shen Kuo created a raised-relief map, while his other maps featured a uniform graduated scale of 1:900,000. A 3 ft (0.91 m) squared map of 1137—carved into a stone block—followed a uniform grid scale of 100 li for each gridded square, and accurately mapped the outline of the coasts and river systems of China, extending all the way to India. Furthermore, the world's oldest known terrain map in printed form comes from the edited encyclopedia of Yang Jia in 1155, which displayed western China without the formal grid system that was characteristic of more professionally made Chinese maps. Although gazetteers had existed since 52 CE during the Han dynasty and gazetteers accompanied by illustrative maps (Chinese: tujing) since the Sui dynasty, the illustrated gazetteer became much more common during the Song dynasty, when the foremost concern was for illustrative gazetteers to serve political, administrative, and military purposes.

=== Movable type printing ===
The innovation of movable type printing was made by the artisan Bi Sheng (990–1051), first described by the scientist and statesman Shen Kuo in his Dream Pool Essays of 1088. The collection of Bi Sheng's original clay-fired typeface was passed on to one of Shen Kuo's nephews, and was carefully preserved. Movable type enhanced the already widespread use of woodblock methods of printing thousands of documents and volumes of written literature, consumed eagerly by an increasingly literate public. The advancement of printing deeply affected education and the scholar-official class, since more books could be made faster while mass-produced, printed books were cheaper in comparison to laborious handwritten copies. The enhancement of widespread printing and print culture in the Song period was thus a direct catalyst in the rise of social mobility and expansion of the educated class of scholar elites, the latter which expanded dramatically in size from the 11th to 13th centuries.

The movable type invented by Bi Sheng was ultimately trumped by the use of woodblock printing due to the limitations of Chinese characters, yet movable type printing continued to be used and was improved in later periods. The Yuan scholar-official Wang Zhen (fl. 1290–1333) implemented a faster typesetting process, improved Bi's baked-clay movable type character set with a wooden one, and experimented with tin-metal movable type. The wealthy printing patron Hua Sui (1439–1513) of the Ming dynasty established China's first metal movable type (using bronze) in 1490. In 1638, the Peking Gazette switched their printing process from woodblock to movable type printing. Yet it was during the Qing dynasty that massive printing projects began to employ movable type printing. This includes the printing of sixty-six copies of a 5,020 volume long encyclopedia in 1725, the Complete Classics Collection of Ancient China, which necessitated the crafting of 250,000 movable type characters cast in bronze. Due to European and American missionaries, the Western mechanical printing press, electrotype, and lithography started to replace the old Chinese methods of movable type and traditional woodblock printing in Qing dynasty China during the 19th century.

=== Hydraulic and nautical engineering ===
The most important nautical innovation of the Song period seems to have been the introduction of the magnetic mariner's compass, which permitted accurate navigation on the open sea regardless of the weather. The magnetized compass needle was first described by the scientist and statesman Shen Kuo in his 1088 Dream Pool Essays. It was first mentioned in active use by sailors in Zhu Yu's 1119 Pingzhou Table Talks.

A plan and side view of a canal pound lock, a concept pioneered in 984 by the Assistant Commissioner of Transport for Huainan, the engineer Qiao Weiyo.

There were other considerable advancements in hydraulic engineering and nautical technology during the Song dynasty. The 10th-century invention of the pound lock for canal systems allowed different water levels to be raised and lowered for separated segments of a canal, which significantly aided the safety of canal traffic and allowed for larger barges. There was the Song-era innovation of watertight bulkhead compartments that allowed damage to hulls without sinking the ships. If ships were damaged, the Chinese of the 11th century employed drydocks to repair them while suspended out of the water. The Song used crossbeams to brace the ribs of ships in order to strengthen them in a skeletal-like structure. Stern-mounted rudders had been mounted on Chinese ships since the 1st century, as evidenced by a preserved Han tomb model of a ship. In the Song period, the Chinese devised a way to mechanically raise and lower rudders in order for ships to travel in a wider range of water depths. The Song arranged the protruding teeth of anchors in a circular pattern instead of in one direction. David Graff and Robin Higham state that this arrangement "[made] them more reliable" for anchoring ships.

=== Structural engineering and architecture ===
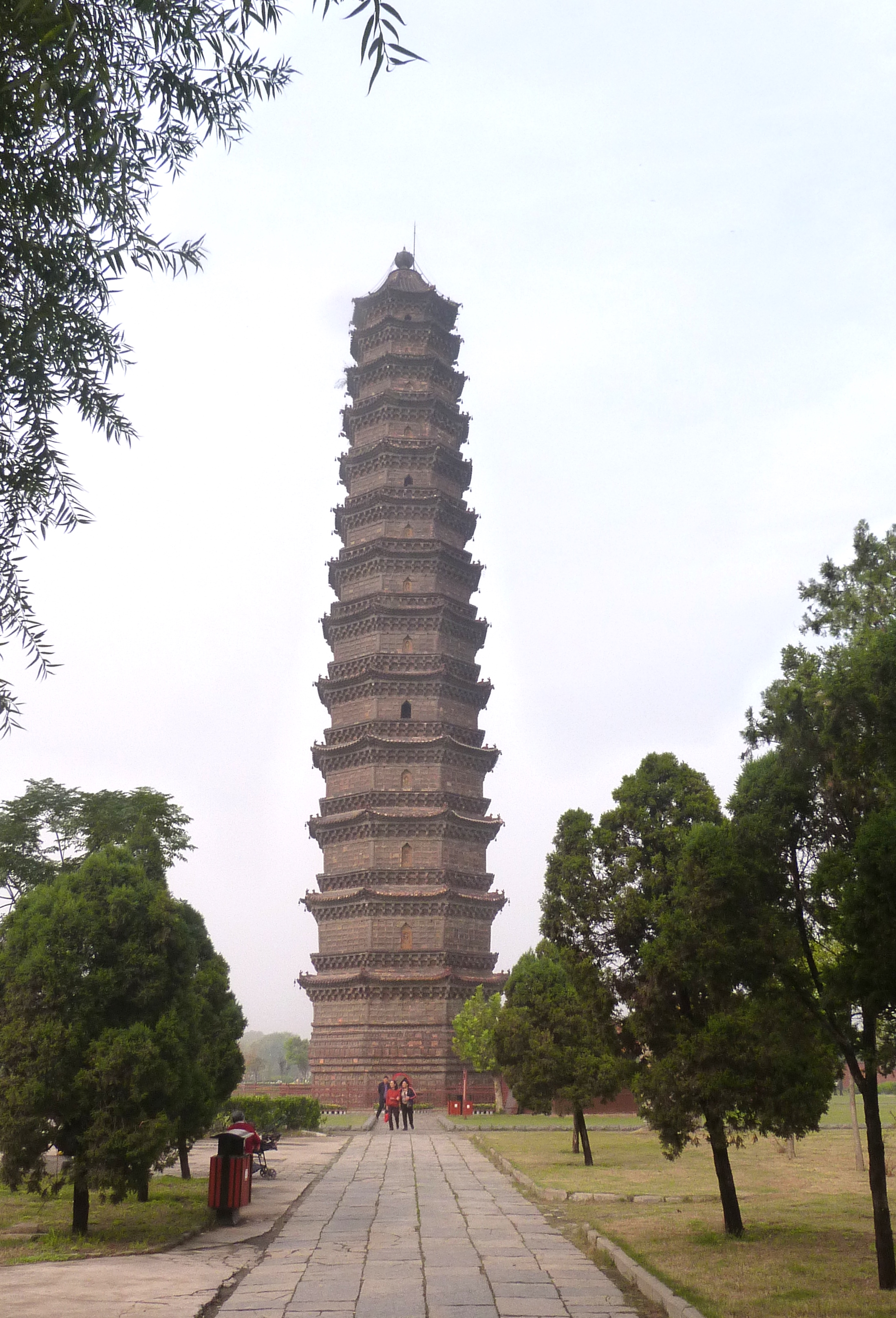
The Iron Pagoda of Kaifeng, built in 1049

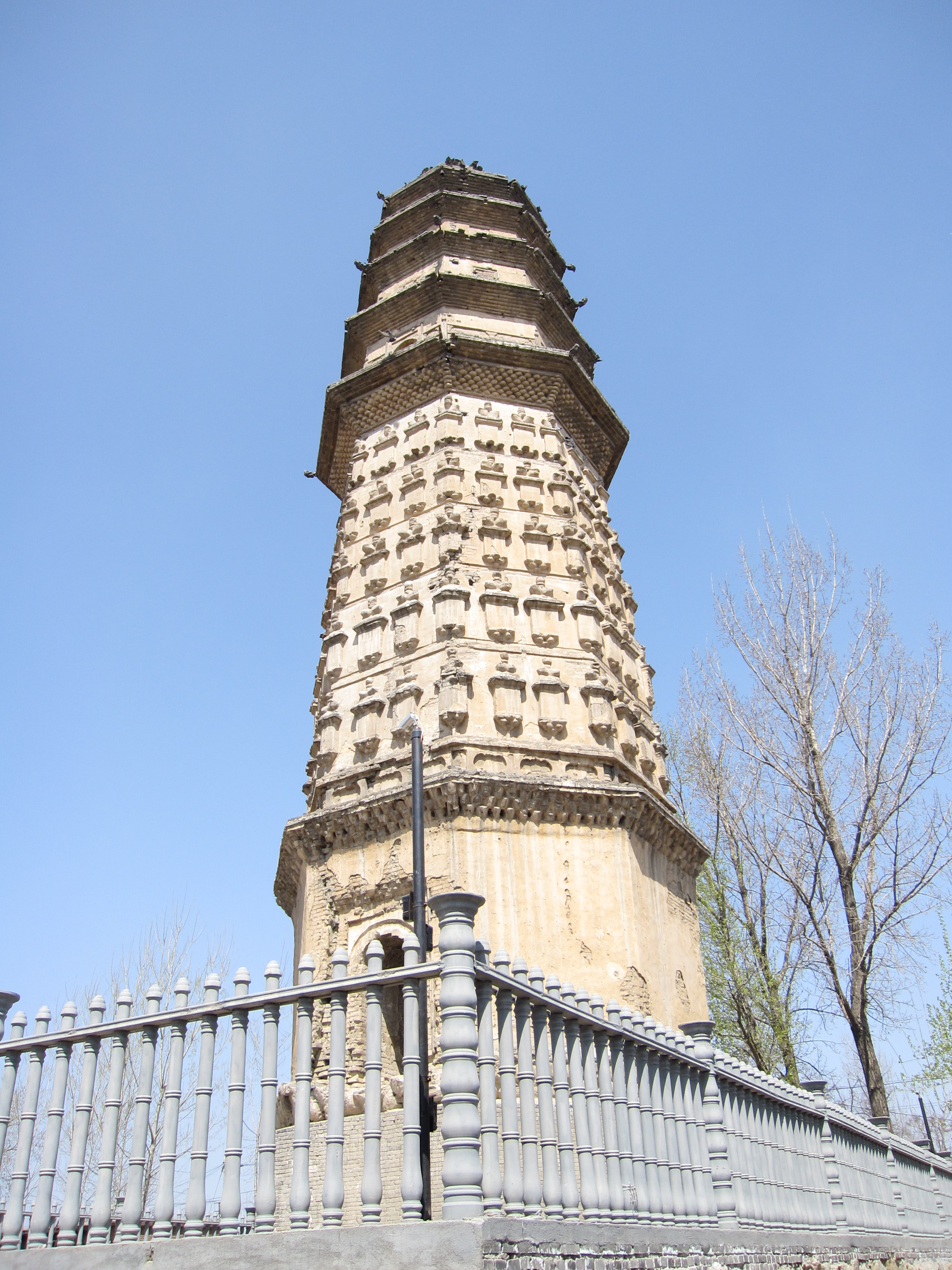
The Xiude Temple Pagoda in Quyang, Hebei

Architecture during the Song period reached new heights of sophistication. Authors such as Yu Hao and Shen Kuo wrote books outlining the field of architectural layouts, craftsmanship, and structural engineering in the 10th and 11th centuries, respectively. Shen Kuo preserved the written dialogues of Yu Hao when describing technical issues such as slanting struts built into pagoda towers for diagonal wind bracing. Shen Kuo also preserved Yu's specified dimensions and units of measurement for various building types. The architect Li Jie (1065–1110), who published the Yingzao Fashi ('Treatise on Architectural Methods') in 1103, greatly expanded upon the works of Yu Hao and compiled the standard building codes used by the central government agencies and by craftsmen throughout the empire. He addressed the standard methods of construction, design, and applications of moats and fortifications, stonework, greater woodwork, lesser woodwork, wood-carving, turning and drilling, sawing, bamboo work, tiling, wall building, painting and decoration, brickwork, glazed tile making, and provided proportions for mortar formulas in masonry. In his book, Li provided detailed and vivid illustrations of architectural components and cross-sections of buildings. These illustrations displayed various applications of corbel brackets, cantilever arms, mortise and tenon work of tie beams and cross beams, and diagrams showing the various building types of halls in graded sizes. He also outlined the standard units of measurement and standard dimensional measurements of all building components described and illustrated in his book.

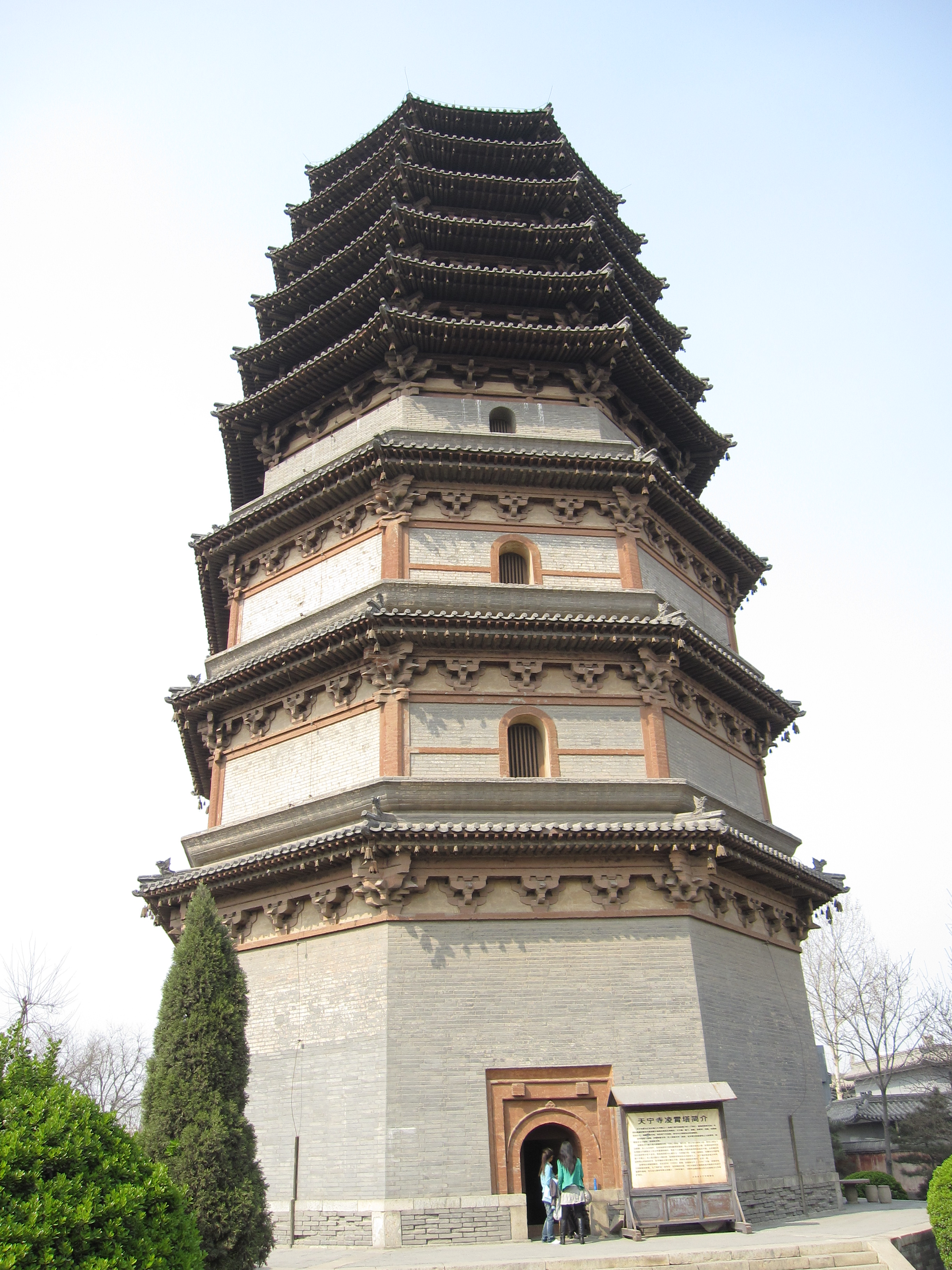
The 42-metre (138 ft) tall, brick and wood Lingxiao Pagoda of Zhengding, Hebei, built in 1045.

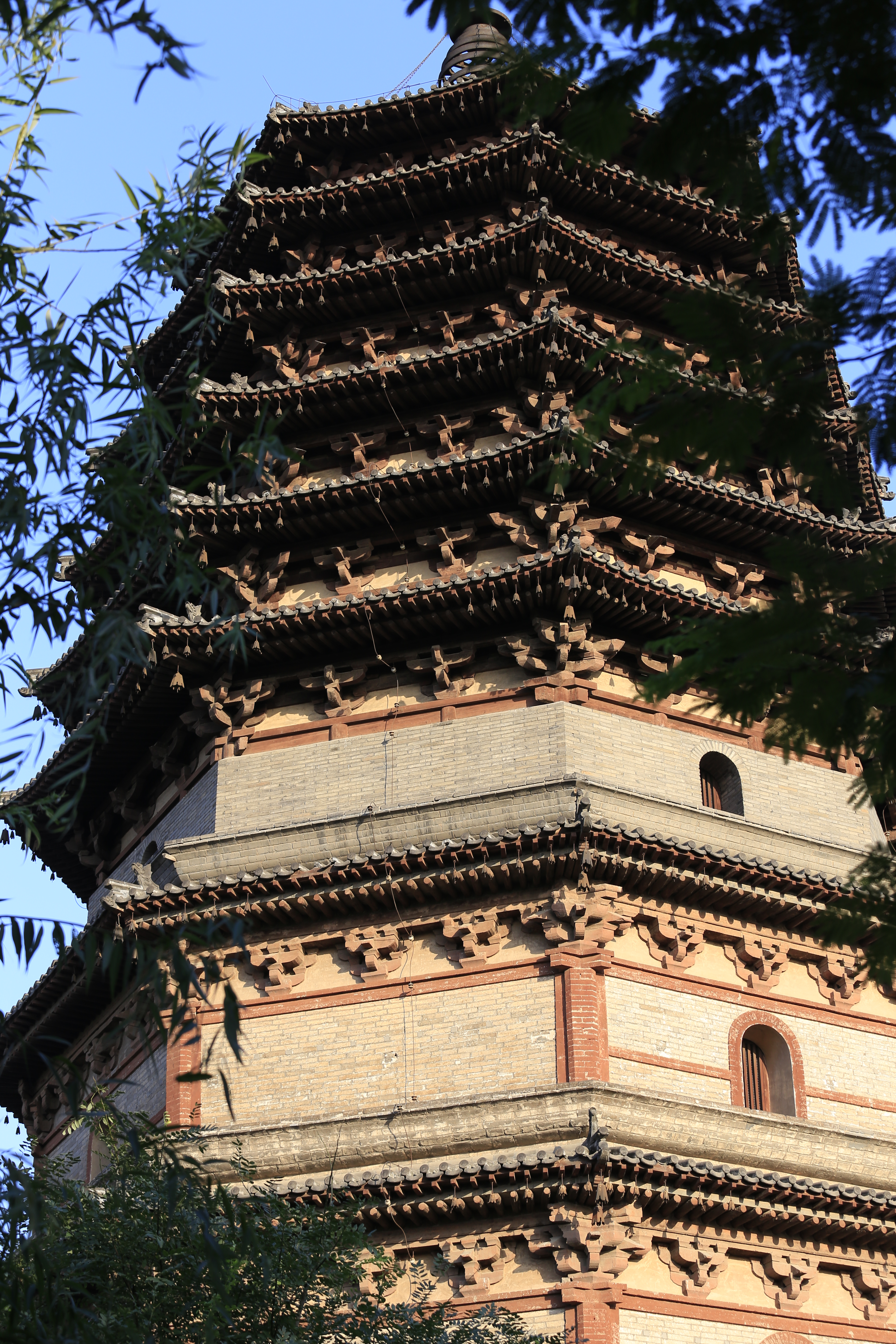
Close-up view of the Lingxiao Pagoda

Grandiose building projects were supported by the government, including the erection of towering Buddhist Chinese pagodas and the construction of enormous bridges (wood or stone, trestle or segmental arch bridge). Many of the pagoda towers built during the Song period were erected at heights that exceeded ten stories. Some of the most famous are the Iron Pagoda built in 1049 during the Northern Song and the Liuhe Pagoda built in 1165 during the Southern Song, though there were others. The tallest is the Liaodi Pagoda built in 1055 in Hebei, towering 84 m (276 ft) in total height. Some of the bridges reached lengths of 1,220 m (4,000 ft), with many being wide enough to allow two lanes of cart traffic simultaneously over a waterway or ravine. The government also oversaw construction of their own administrative offices, palace apartments, city fortifications, ancestral temples, and Buddhist temples.

The professions of the architect, craftsman, carpenter, and structural engineer were not seen as professionally equal to that of a Confucian scholar-official. Architectural knowledge had been passed down orally for thousands of years in China, in many cases from a father craftsman to his son. Structural engineering and architecture schools were known to have existed during the Song period; one prestigious engineering school was headed by the renowned bridge-builder Cai Xiang (1012–1067) in medieval Fujian province.

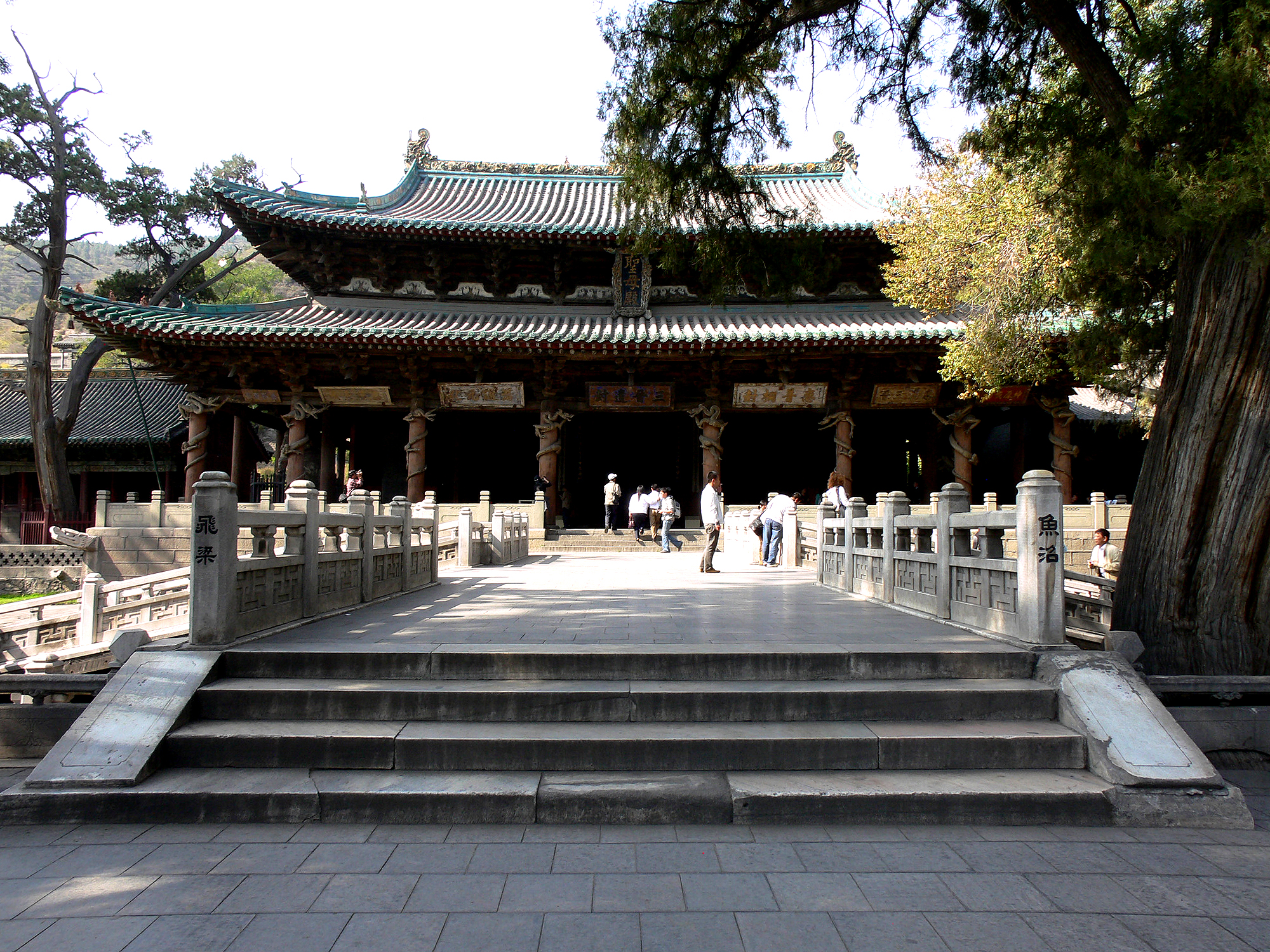
Temple of the Saintly Mother, Jin Temple, Taiyuan, built in 1032

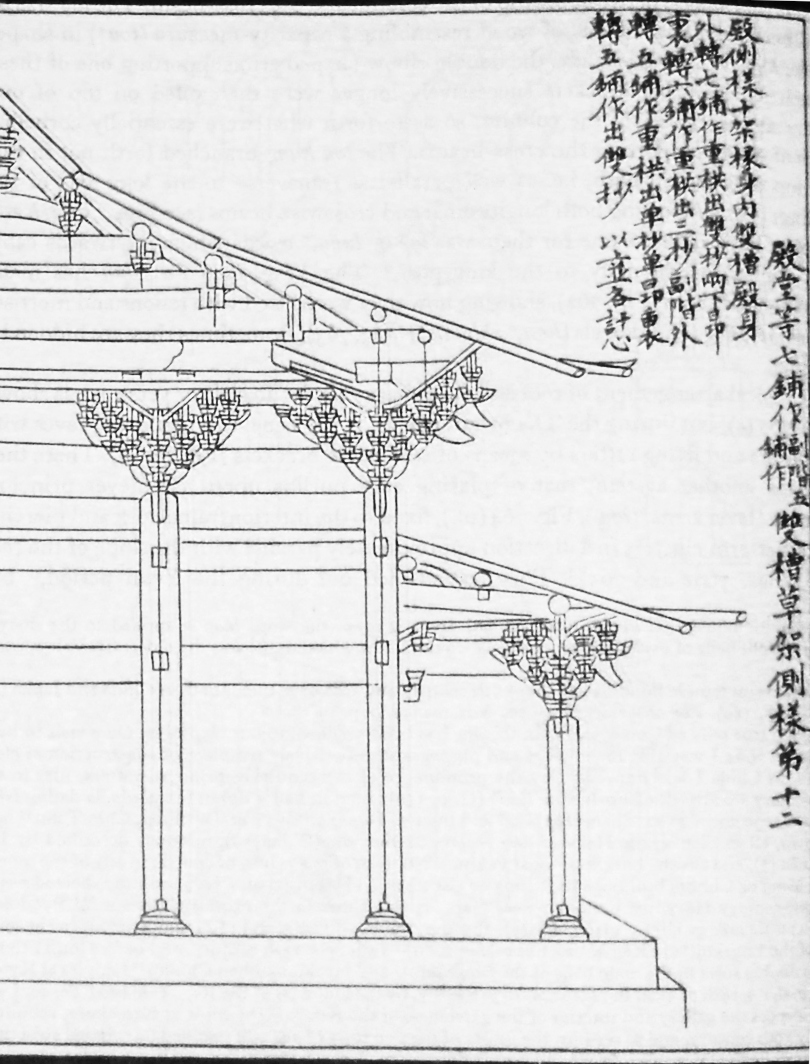
Bracket arm clusters containing cantilevers, from Li Jie's building manual Yingzao Fashi, printed in 1103.

Besides existing buildings and technical literature of building manuals, Song dynasty artwork portraying cityscapes and other buildings aid modern-day scholars in their attempts to reconstruct and realize the nuances of Song architecture. Song dynasty artists such as Li Cheng, Fan Kuan, Guo Xi, Zhang Zeduan, Emperor Huizong of Song, and Ma Lin painted close-up depictions of buildings as well as large expanses of cityscapes featuring arched bridges, halls and pavilions, pagoda towers, and distinct Chinese city walls. The scientist and statesman Shen Kuo was known for his criticism relating to architecture, saying that it was more important for an artist to capture a holistic view of a landscape than it was to focus on the angles and corners of buildings. For example, Shen criticized the work of the painter Li Cheng for failing to observe the principle of "seeing the small from the viewpoint of the large" in portraying buildings.

There were also pyramidal tomb structures in the Song era, such as the Song imperial tombs located in Gongxian, Henan. About 100 km (62 mi) from Gongxian is another Song dynasty tomb at Baisha, which features "elaborate facsimiles in brick of Chinese timber frame construction, from door lintels to pillars and pedestals to bracket sets, that adorn interior walls." The two large chambers of the Baisha tomb also feature conical-shaped roofs. Flanking the avenues leading to these tombs are lines of Song dynasty stone statues of officials, tomb guardians, animals, and legendary creatures.

=== Archaeology ===
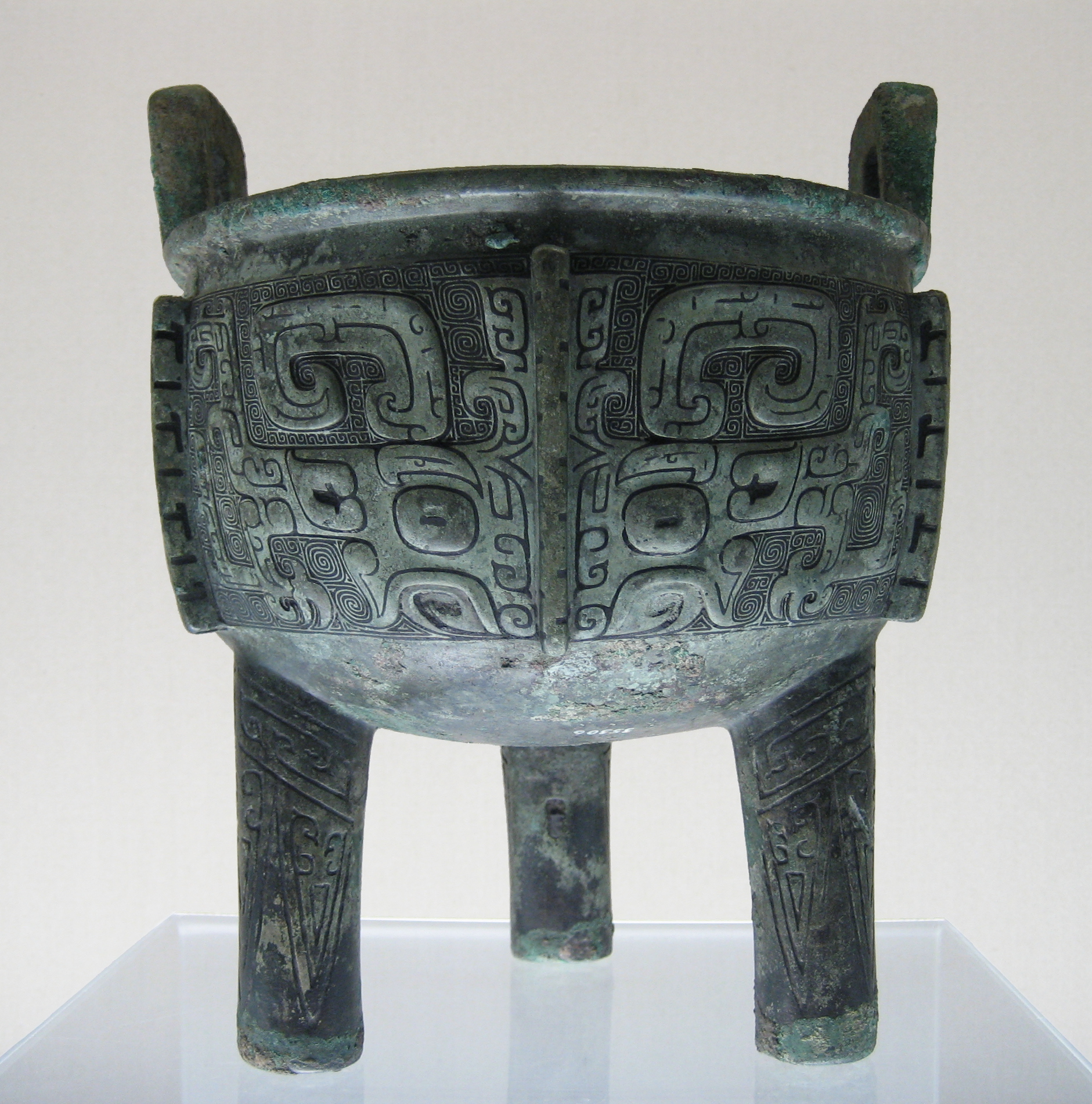
Scholars of the Song dynasty claim to have collected ancient relics dating back as far as the Shang dynasty, such as this bronze ding vessel.

In addition to the Song gentry's antiquarian pursuits of art collecting, scholar-officials during the Song became highly interested in retrieving ancient relics from archaeological sites, in order to revive the use of ancient vessels in ceremonies of state ritual. Scholar-officials of the Song period claimed to have discovered ancient bronze vessels that were created as far back as the Shang dynasty (1600–1046 BCE), which bore the oracle bone script of the Shang era. Some attempted to recreate these bronze vessels by using imagination alone, not by observing tangible evidence of relics; this practice was criticized by Shen Kuo in his work of 1088. Yet Shen Kuo had much more to criticize than this practice alone. Shen objected to the idea of his peers that ancient relics were products created by famous "sages" in lore or the ancient aristocratic class; Shen rightfully attributed the discovered handicrafts and vessels from ancient times as the work of artisans and commoners from previous eras. He also disapproved of his peers' pursuit of archaeology simply to enhance state ritual, since Shen not only took an interdisciplinary approach with the study of archaeology, but he also emphasized the study of functionality and investigating what was the ancient relics' original processes of manufacture. Shen used ancient texts and existing models of armillary spheres to create one based on ancient standards; Shen described ancient weaponry such as the use of a scaled sighting device on crossbows; while experimenting with ancient musical measures, Shen suggested hanging an ancient bell by using a hollow handle.

Despite the gentry's overriding interest in archaeology simply for reviving ancient state rituals, some of Shen's peers took a similar approach to the study of archaeology. His contemporary Ouyang Xiu (1007–1072) compiled an analytical catalogue of ancient rubbings on stone and bronze which pioneered ideas in early epigraphy and archaeology. During the 11th century, Song scholars discovered the ancient shrine of Wu Liang (78–151 CE), a scholar of the Han dynasty; they produced rubbings of the carvings and bas-reliefs decorating the walls of his tomb so that they could be analyzed elsewhere. On the unreliability of historical works written after the fact, the epigrapher and poet Zhao Mingcheng (1081–1129) stated "... the inscriptions on stone and bronze are made at the time the events took place and can be trusted without reservation, and thus discrepancies may be discovered." Historian R.C. Rudolph states that Zhao's emphasis on consulting contemporary sources for accurate dating is parallel with the concern of the German historian Leopold von Ranke (1795–1886), and was in fact emphasized by many Song scholars. The Song scholar Hong Mai (1123–1202) heavily criticized what he called the court's "ridiculous" archaeological catalogue Bogutu compiled during the Huizong reign periods of Zheng He and Xuan He (1111–1125). Hong Mai obtained old vessels from the Han dynasty and compared them with the descriptions offered in the catalogue, which he found so inaccurate he stated he had to "hold my sides with laughter." Hong Mai pointed out that the erroneous material was the fault of Chancellor Cai Jing, who prohibited scholars from reading and consulting written histories.

== See also ==
- Emperors' family tree
- Four Great Books of Song
- House of Zhao
- Lu You
- Shao Yong
- Tang Clan
- Taxation in premodern China
- Tianchao Daguo
- Tiger Cave Kiln
- Timeline of the Song dynasty
- Wang Chongyang
- Water Margin
- Wen Tianxiang
- Zeng Gong

Preceded by Five Dynasties and Ten Kingdoms	Dynasties in Chinese history 960–1279	Succeeded by Yuan dynasty
