= Jinghu =

Jinghu may refer to:

- Jinghu (instrument) (京胡), Chinese bowed string instrument in the huqin family

== Places ==
- Jinghu District (镜湖区), a district in Wuhu, Anhui, China
- Jinghu Subdistrict (镜湖街道), a subdistrict in Ningjiang District, Songyuan, Jilin, China
- Jinghu Circuit (荆湖路), a circuit or province of the Song dynasty

== Beijing/Shanghai ==
- Jinghu (京沪), a colloquial term referring to Beijing and Shanghai, two of the largest cities in China
  - Jinghu Expressway, road linking Beijing to Shanghai in China
  - Jinghu railway, train line running between Beijing and Shanghai in China
  - Beijing–Shanghai high-speed railway, high speed railway between Beijing and Shanghai in China
