= Jinghu South Circuit =

Administrative division during the Song dynasty

- Simplified Chinese: 荊湖南路
- Hanyu Pinyin: Jīnghú Nàn Lù
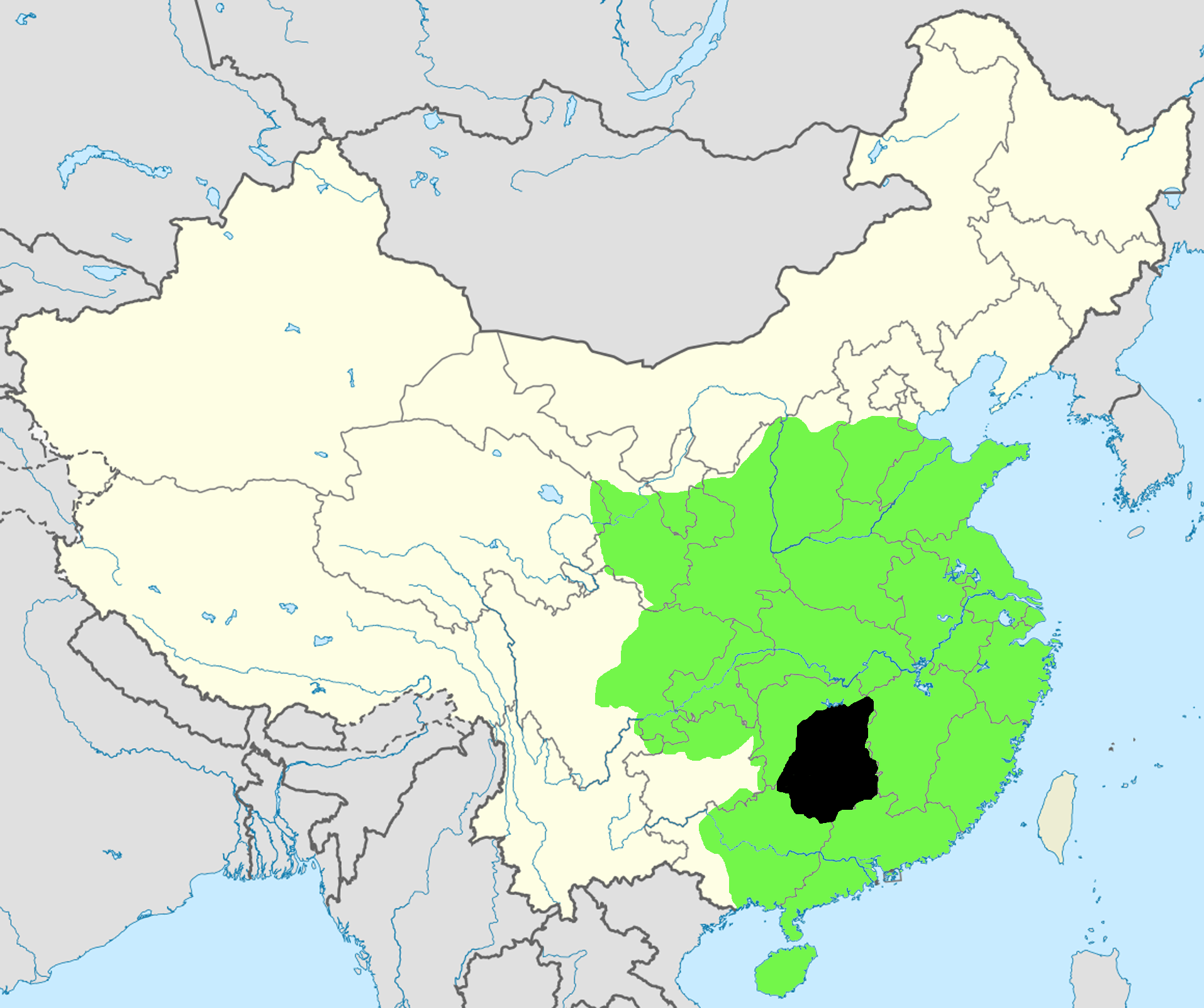
- Jinghu South Circuit within Song dynasty territory, c. 1100
- Population
  - 1162: 2,136,767
- History
  - Preceded by: Jinghu Circuit
  - Created: 998 (Song dynasty)
  - Abolished: 1270s (Yuan dynasty)
  - HQ: Tan Prefecture
- Today part of: China

Jinghu South Circuit or Jinghu South Province was one of the circuits during the Song dynasty. Its administrative area corresponds roughly to the modern province of Hunan.

Jinghu South Circuit and Jinghu North Circuit were split from Jinghu Circuit in 998.
