= Jinghu North Circuit =

- Simplified Chinese: 荊湖北路
- Hanyu Pinyin: Jīnghú Běi Lù
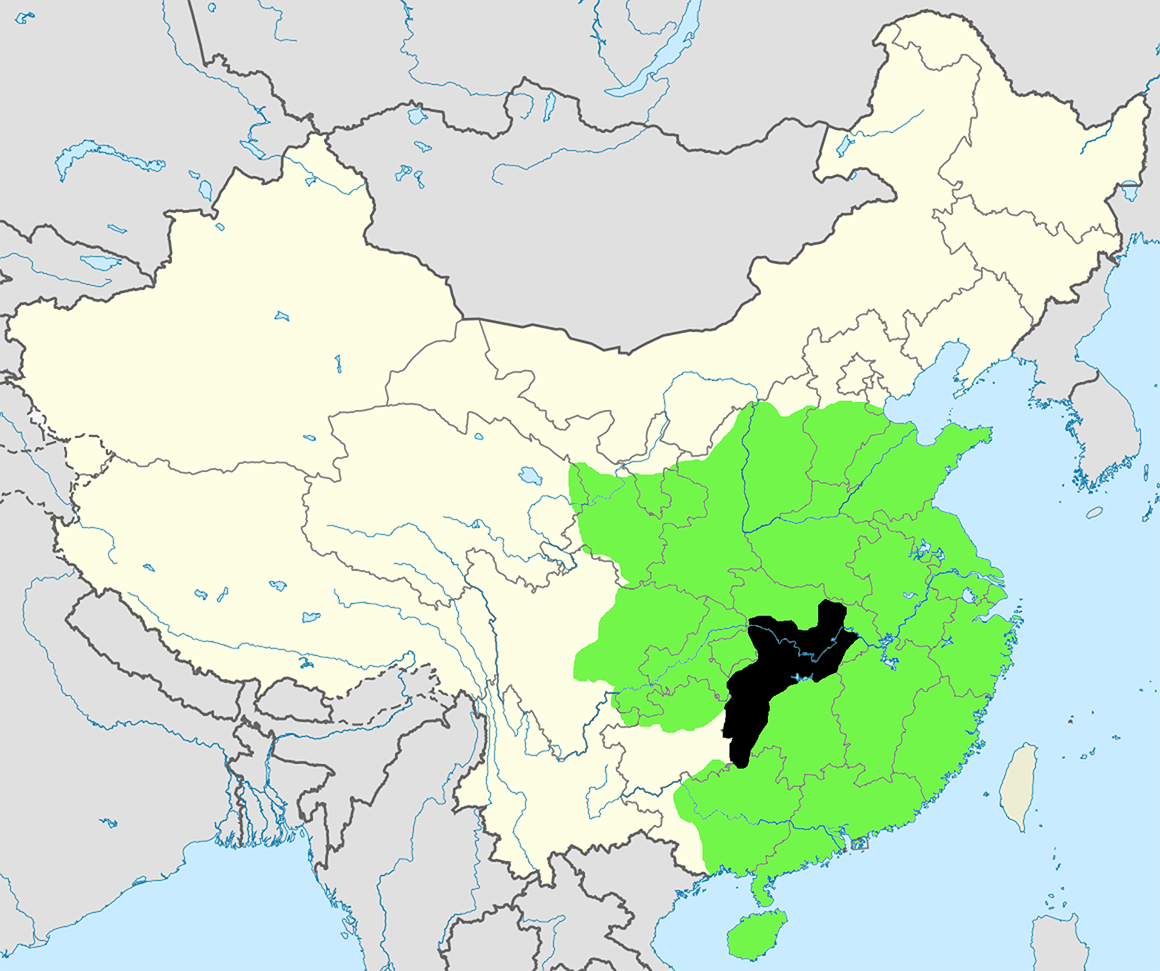
- Jinghu North Circuit within Song dynasty territory, c. 1100
- Population
  - 1162: 445,844
- History
  - Preceded by: Jinghu Circuit
  - Created: 998 (Song dynasty)
  - Abolished: 1270s (Yuan dynasty)
  - HQ: Jiangling Prefecture

Jinghu North Circuit or Jinghu North Province was one of the circuits during the Song dynasty. Its administrative area corresponds to roughly the modern province of Hunan.

Jinghu North Circuit and Jinghu South Circuit were split from Jinghu Circuit in 998.
