= Jinghu Subdistrict =

Jinghu Subdistrict 镜湖街道
- Subdistrict
- Location in Jilin
- Coordinates: 45°07′39″N 124°48′21″E
- Country: People's Republic of China
- Province: Jilin
- Prefecture-level city: Songyuan
- District: Ningjiang District
- Time zone: UTC+8 (China Standard)

Jinghu Subdistrict (simplified Chinese: 镜湖街道; traditional Chinese: 鏡湖街道; pinyin: Jìnghú Jiēdào) is a subdistrict in Ningjiang District, Songyuan, Jilin province, China. As of 2020, it has three residential communities under its administration:

- Jinghu Community
- Jing'an Community (静安社区)
- Wanghu Community (望湖社区)

== See also ==
- List of township-level divisions of Jilin
