= Yi Prefecture (Guangxi) =

Historical administrative division in Guangxi, China

Yizhou or Yi Prefecture (宜州) was a zhou (prefecture) in imperial China centering on modern Yizhou, Guangxi, China. It existed (intermittently) from the late 660s to 1265.

The modern district Yizhou of Hechi city, created in 1993, retains its name.

== Geography ==
The administrative region of Yizhou in the Tang dynasty falls within modern Hechi in northern Guangxi. It probably includes modern:

- Yizhou
- Luocheng Mulao Autonomous County
