= Jinghu Circuit =

Song dynasty province

- Chinese: 荊湖路
Transcriptions
Standard Mandarin
- Hanyu Pinyin: Jīnghú Lù

Jinghu Circuit or Jinghu Province was one of the major circuits during the Song dynasty from 985 and 998. In 998 it was divided into 2 circuits: Jinghu North Circuit and Jinghu South Circuit.

Its administrative area corresponds to roughly the modern provinces of Hunan, southern Hubei and northeastern Guangxi.
