= Precolonial Mauritania =

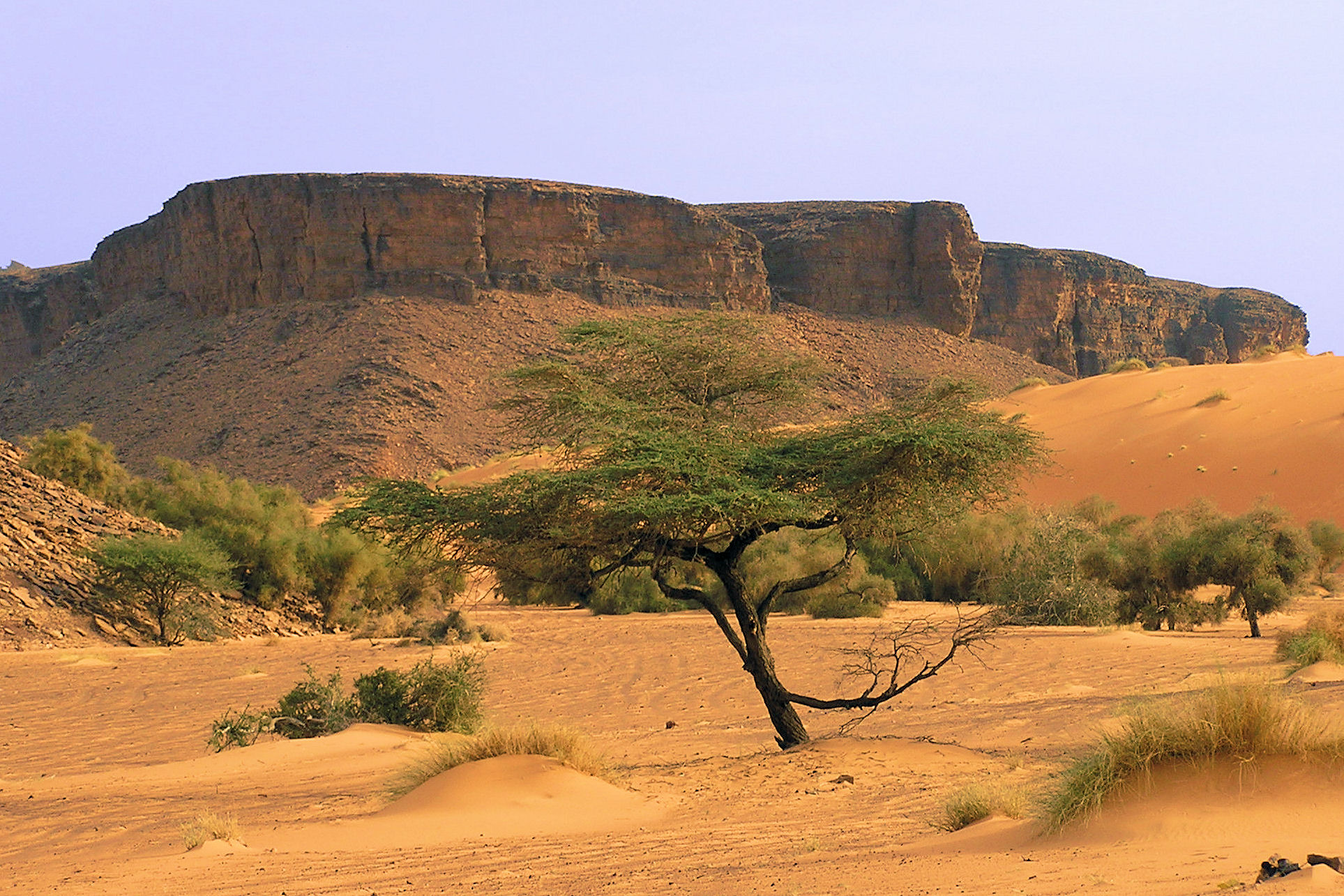
Mountains in the Adrar region; desert scenes continue to define the Mauritanian landscape since classical times

Precolonial Mauritania, lying next to the Atlantic coast at the western edge of the Sahara Desert, received and assimilated into its complex society many waves of Saharan migrants and conquerors.

Plinius wrote that the area north of the river Senegal was populated, during Augustus times, by the Pharusii and Perorsi.

Berbers moved south to Mauritania beginning in the 3rd century, followed by Arabs in the 8th century, subjugating and assimilating Mauritania's original inhabitants.

The Umayyads were the first Arab Muslims to enter Mauritania. During the Islamic conquests, they made incursions into Mauritania and were present in the region by the end of the 7th century. Many Berber tribes in Mauritania fled the arrival of the Arabs to the Gao region in Mali.

From the 15th century, there was also limited European trading activity, mostly in gum arabic.

The tensions between the tribal Berber groups which had established themselves before the arrival of Islam, and the Arabized and Muslim Beni Hassan came to a head in the long Char Bouba war of 1644 to 1674.

The resulting victory of the Beni Hassan sealed the fate of Mauritania as an Arabized Muslim territory, the last part of Africa to be acquired into the Muslim World before the Muslim expansion was checked by the European Scramble for Africa in the 19th century.

There was French presence at the Senegal River from the 17th century, and by 1840, Senegal became a permanent French possession.

The colonization of Mauritania was an expansion of the area of French control over Senegal, beginning in the form of punitive expeditions against the Maures. The colonial period of Mauritania lasted for a mere two generations, from 1904 to 1960.

The French authorities had difficulty in maintaining order in view of the numerous and complicated conflicts among the area's numerous factions and sub-factions. They attempted to abolish slavery in 1905, but with very limited success.

Mauritanian independence was granted in 1960, following a 1958 referendum under the French Fifth Republic.

== Characteristics ==
In the year 41 AD Suetonius Paullinus, afterwards Consul, was the first of the Romans who led an army across Mount Atlas. At the end of a ten days' march he reached the summit,—which even in summer was covered with snow,—and from thence, after passing a desert of black sand and burnt rocks, he arrived at a river called Gerj...he then penetrated into the country of the Canarii and Perorsi, the former of whom inhabited a woody region abounding in elephants and serpents, and the latter were Ethiopians, not far distant from the Pharusii and the river Daras (modern river Senegal)

What is now Mauritania was a dry savanna area during classical antiquity, where independent tribes like the Pharusii and the Perorsi (and the Nigritae near the Niger river) lived a semi-nomadic life facing the growing desertification of the Sahara.

Romans did explorations toward this area and probably reached, with Suetonius Paulinus, the area of Adrar. There are evidences (coins, fibulas) of Roman commerce in Akjoujt and Tamkartkart near Tichit.

Some Berber tribes moved to Mauritania in the 3rd and 4th century, and after the 8th century some Arabs entered the region as conquerors.

From the 8th century through the 15th century, black kingdoms of the western Sudan, such as Ghana Empire, Mali Empire, and Songhai Empire, brought their political culture from the south.

The divisive tendencies of the various groups within Mauritanian society have always worked against the development of Mauritanian unity. Both the Sanhadja Confederation, at its height from the 8th century to the 10th century, and the Almoravid Empire, from the 11th century to the 12th century, were weakened by internecine warfare, and succumbed to further invasions from the Ghana Empire and the Almohad Empire, respectively.

The first external influence that tended to unify the country was Islam. The Islamization of Mauritania was a gradual process that spanned more than 500 years. Beginning slowly through contacts with Berber and Arab merchants engaged in the important caravan trades and rapidly advancing through the Almoravid conquests, Islamization did not take firm hold until the arrival of Yemeni Arabs in the 12th and 13th centuries and was not complete until several centuries later. Gradual Islamization was accompanied by a process of Arabization as well, during which the Berber masters of Mauritania lost power and became vassals of their Arab conquerors.

From the 15th century to the 19th century, European contact with Mauritania was dominated by the trade for gum arabic. Rivalries among European powers enabled the Arab-Berber population, the Maures (Moors), to maintain their independence and later to exact annual payments from France, whose sovereignty over the Sénégal River and the Mauritanian coast was recognized by the Congress of Vienna in 1815. Although penetration beyond the coast and the Senegal River began in earnest under Louis Faidherbe, governor of Senegal in the mid-19th century, European conquest or "pacification" of the entire country did not begin until 1900.

France created the boundaries of contemporary Mauritania and administered it until the independence in the 1960s. Because extensive European contact began so late in the country's history, the traditional social structure carried over into modern times with little change.

French rule brought legal prohibitions against slavery, and an end to interclan warfare. During the colonial period, the population remained nomadic, but many sedentary peoples, whose ancestors had been expelled centuries earlier, began to trickle back into Mauritania. As the country gained independence in 1960, the capital city Nouakchott was founded at the site of a small colonial village, the Ksar, while 90% of the population was still nomadic.

== Early history ==
The prehistory of the west Saharan region is not fully characterized. There are some written accounts by medieval Arab traders and explorers who reached the important caravan trading centers and Sudanic kingdoms of eastern Mauritania, but the major sources of pre-European history are oral history, legends, and archaeological evidence. These sources indicate that during the millennia preceding the Christian Era, the Sahara was a more habitable region than it is today and supported a flourishing culture. In the area that is now Mauritania, the Bafour, a proto-Berber people, whose descendants may be the coastal Imraguen fishermen, were hunters, pastoralists, and fishermen. Valley cultivators, who may have been black ancestors of the riverine Toucouleur and Wolof peoples, lived alongside the Bafour. Dhar Tichitt is the oldest surviving archaeological settlements in West Africa and the oldest of all stone base settlements south of the Sahara. It was built by the Soninke people (or by the Serers) and is thought to be the precursor of the Ghana empire. It was being settled around 2000 BCE. Climatic changes, and perhaps overgrazing, led to a gradual desiccation of the Sahara and the southward movement of these peoples.

The Romans did some expeditions south of their Mauretania Tingitana, perhaps reaching the area north of the river Senegal populated by the Pharusii tribe.

In the 3rd and 4th centuries, this southward migration from the southern Atlas region was intensified by the arrival of Berber groups from the north who were searching for pasturage or fleeing political anarchy and war. The wide-ranging activities of these turbulent Berber warriors were made possible by the introduction of the camel to the Sahara in this period. This first wave of Berber invaders subjugated and made vassals of those Bafour who did not flee south.

Other Berber groups followed in the 7th and 8th centuries, themselves fleeing in large numbers before the Arab conquerors of the Maghreb.

== Arab invasions ==
The Umayyads were the first Arab Muslims to enter Mauritania. During the Islamic conquests, they made incursions into Mauritania and were present in the region by the end of the 7th century. Many Berber tribes in Mauritania fled the arrival of the Arabs to the Gao region in Mali.

By the 16th century, most blacks had been pushed to the Sénégal River. Those remaining in the north became slaves cultivating the oasis.

After the decline of the Almoravid Empire, a long process of Arabization began in Mauritania, one that until then had been resisted successfully by the Berbers. Several groups of Yemeni Arabs who had been in the north of Africa turned south to Mauritania. Settling in northern Mauritania, they disrupted the caravan trade, causing routes to shift east, which in turn led to the gradual decline of Mauritania's trading towns. One particular Yemeni group, the Bani Hassan, continued to migrate southward until, by the end of the 17th century, they dominated the entire country. The last effort of the Berbers to shake off the Arab yoke was the Mauritanian Thirty Years' War (1644–74), or Sharr Bubba, led by Nasr ad-Din, a Lemtuna imam. This Sanhadja war of liberation was, however, unsuccessful; the Berbers were forced to abandon the sword and became vassals to the warrior Arab groups.

Thus, the contemporary social structure of Mauritania can be dated from 1674. The warrior groups or Arabs dominated the Berber groups, who turned to clericalism to regain a degree of ascendancy. At the bottom of the social structure were the slaves, subservient to both warriors and Islamic holy men. All of these groups, whose language was Hassaniya Arabic, became known as Maures. The bitter rivalries and resentments characteristic of their social structure were later fully exploited by the French.

== Sanhadja Confederation ==
One of the Berber groups arriving in Mauritania in the 8th century was the Lemtuna. By the 9th century, the Lemtuna had attained political dominance in the Adrar and Hodh regions. Together with two other important Berber groups, the Messufa and the Godala, they set up the Sanhadja Confederation. From their capital, Aoudaghost, the Lemtuna controlled this loose confederation and the western routes of the Saharan caravan trade that had begun to flourish after the introduction of the camel. At its height, from the eighth to the end of the 10th century, the Sanhadja Confederation was a decentralized polity based on two distinct groups: the nomadic and very independent Berber groups, who maintained their traditional religions, and the Muslim, urban Berber merchants, who conducted the caravan trade.

Although dominated by the Sanhadja merchants, the caravan trade had its northern terminus in the Maghribi commercial city of Sijilmasa and its southern terminus in Koumbi Saleh, capital of the Ghana Empire. Later, the southern trade route ended in Timbuktu, capital of the Mali Empire. Gold, ivory, and slaves were carried north in return for salt (ancient salt mines near Kediet Ijill in northern Mauritania are still being worked), copper, cloth, and other luxury goods.

Important towns developed along the trade routes. The easiest, though not the shortest, routes between Ghana and Sijilmasa were from Koumbi Saleh through Aoudaghost, Oualâta, Tîchît, and Ouadane. These towns along the route grew to be important commercial as well as political centers. The 11th-century Arab chronicler Al-Bakri describes Aoudaghast, with its population of 5,000 to 6,000, as a big town with a large mosque and several smaller ones, surrounded by large, cultivated areas under irrigation. Oualâta was a major relay point on the gold and salt trade route, as well as a chief assembly point for pilgrims traveling to Mecca. Koumbi Saleh was a large cosmopolitan city comprising two distinct sections: the Muslim quarter, with its Arab-influenced architecture, and the black quarter of traditional thatch and mud architecture, where the non-Muslim king of Ghana resided.

Another important Mauritanian trade city of the Sanhadja Confederation was Chinguetti, later an important religious center. Although Koumbi Saleh did not outlive the fall of the Ghana Empire, Aoudaghost and particularly Oualâta maintained their importance well into the 16th century, when trade began shifting to the European-controlled coasts.

== Almoravids ==
By the 11th century, traditional religious practices thrived. The conquest of the entire west Saharan region by the Almoravids in the 11th century made possible a more orthodox Islamization of all the peoples of Mauritania.

The breakup of the Sanhadja Confederation in the early 11th century led to a period of unrest and warfare among the Sanhadja Berber groups of Mauritania. In about 1039, a chief of the Godala, Yahya ibn Ibrahim, returned from a pilgrimage to Mecca bringing with him a Sanhadja theologian, Abdallah ibn Yassin, to teach a more orthodox Islam. Rejected by the Godala two years later, after the death of Ibn Ibrahim, Ibn Yassin and some of his Sanhadja followers retired to a secluded place where they built a fortified religious center, a ribat, which attracted many Sanhadja. In 1042 the al murabitun (men of the ribat), as Ibn Yassin's followers came to be called, launched a jihad, or holy war, against the nonbelievers and the heretics among the Sanhadja, beginning what later become known as the Almoravid movement. The initial aim of the Almoravids was to establish a political community in which the ethical and juridical principles of Islam would be strictly applied.

First, the Almoravids attacked and subdued the Godala, forcing them to acknowledge Islam. Then, rallying the other Berber groups of the west Sahara, the Almoravids succeeded in recreating the political unity of the Sanhadja Confederation and adding to it a religious unity and purpose. By 1054 the Almoravids had captured Sijilmasa in the Maghrib and had retaken Aoudaghost from Ghana.

With the death of Ibn Yassin in 1059, leadership of the movement in the south passed to Abu-Bakr Ibn-Umar, emir of Adrar, and to Yusuf ibn Tashfin in the north. Under Ibn Tashfin, the Almoravids captured Morocco and founded Marrakech as their capital in 1062.

By 1082 all of the western Maghrib (to at least present-day Algiers) was under Almoravid domination. In 1086 the Andalusian emirates, under attack from the Spanish Christian king Alfonso and the Christian reconquest of Spain, called on Ibn Tashfin and his Berber warriors to cross the Strait of Gibraltar and come to their rescue. The Almoravids defeated the Spanish Christians and, by 1090, imposed Almoravid rule and the Maliki school of Islamic law in Muslim Spain.

In Mauritania, Abu Bakr led the Almoravids in a war against Ghana (1062–76), culminating in the capture in 1076 of Koumbi Saleh. This event marked the end of the dominance of the Ghana Empire.

But after the death of Abu Bakr in 1087 and Ibn Tashfin in 1106, traditional rivalries among the Sanhadja and a new Muslim reformist conquest led by the Zenata Almohads (1133–63) destroyed the Almoravid Empire.

For a short time, the Mauritanian Sanhadja dynasty of the Almoravid Empire controlled a vast territory stretching from Spain to Senegal. The unity established between Morocco and Mauritania during the Almoravid period continued to have some political importance in the 1980s, as it formed part of the basis for Morocco's claims to Mauritania. But the greatest contribution of the Sanhadja and the Almoravids was the Islamization of the western Maghrib. This process would remain a dominant factor in the history of the area for the next several centuries.

== Sudanic empires and kingdoms ==
Although the Almoravids had substantial contacts with the Maghrib, influences from the black Sudanic kingdoms of Ghana, Mali, and Songhai played an important role in Mauritania's history for about 700 years—from the 8th to the 15th century. Ghana, the first of the great West African Sudanic kingdoms, included in its territory all of southeastern Mauritania extending to Tagant. Ghana reached its apogee in the 9th and 10th centuries with the extension of its rule over the Sanhadja Berbers. This large and centralized kingdom controlled the southern terminus of the trans-Saharan trade in gold, ivory, and salt.

The capture of Koumbi Saleh in 1076 by the Almoravids marked the end of Ghana's hegemony, although the kingdom continued to exist for another 125 years. The Mandé, under the leadership of the legendary Sundiata, founded the second great Sudanic kingdom, Mali. By the end of the 13th century, the Mali Empire extended over that part of Mauritania previously controlled by Ghana, as well as over the remaining Sahelian regions and the Senegal River Valley. Sundiata and his successors took over Ghana's role in the Saharan trade and in the administration and collection of tribute from vast stretches of the Sudan and the Sahel.

The slow decline of the Mali Empire that started at the end of the 14th century came about through internal discord and revolts by the inhabitants of vassal states, including the Songhai of Gao. By the end of the 15th century, the Songhai Empire had replaced the Mali Empire and extended to Mauritania and the upper Senegal River Valley. At the end of the 16th century, a large Moroccan force defeated the Songhai, bringing to an end the seven centuries of domination of the western Sudan (and a large part of Mauritania) by strong, centralized black kingdoms.

== Early European involvement ==
Despite the Almoravid domination of Spain in the 11th and 12th centuries, there seems to be little evidence of contact during that time between Mauritania and Europe. The inhospitable coastline of Mauritania continued to deter voyagers until the Portuguese began their African explorations in the 15th century. The area of Mauritania was of little interest to either Arab or European conquerors; the existence of gold reserves in the interior was not yet known, and the important trade routes passed the territory well to the east, through Timbuktu. The Saadi dynasty conquered much of the Saharan interior but did not show interest in expanding their territory westward.

The Portuguese had established a trading fort at Arguin, southeast of Cap Blanc (present-day Ras Nouadhibou), in 1455.

The king of Portugal also maintained a commercial agent at Ouadane in the Adrar in an attempt to divert gold traveling north by caravan. Having only slight success in their quest for gold, the Portuguese quickly adapted to dealing in slaves. In the mid-15th century, as many as 1,000 slaves per year were exported from Arguin to Europe and to the Portuguese sugar plantations on the island of Sao Tomé in the Gulf of Guinea.

With the merger of the Portuguese and Spanish crowns in 1580, the Spaniards became the dominant influence along the coast. In 1638, however, they were replaced by the Dutch, who were the first to begin exploiting the gum arabic trade. Produced by the acacia trees of Trarza and Brakna and used in textile pattern printing, this gum arabic was considered superior to that previously obtained in Arabia.

By 1678 the French had driven out the Dutch and established a permanent settlement at Saint-Louis at the mouth of the Senegal River, where the French Compagnie du Sénégal had been trading for more than fifty years.

The Maures, with whom the Europeans were trading, considered the constant rivalries between European powers a sign of weakness, and they quickly learned the benefits of playing one power against the other. For example, they agreed simultaneously to give monopolies to the French and the Dutch. The Maures also took advantage of the Europeans whenever possible, so that when the French negotiated with the emir of Trarza to secure a monopoly on the gum arabic trade, the emir in exchange demanded a considerable number of gifts. Thus began the coutume, an annual payment expected by the Maures for doing business with a government or a company. By 1763 the British had expelled France from the West African coast, and France recovered control only when the Congress of Vienna in 1815 recognized French sovereignty over the coast of West Africa from Cap Blanc south to Senegal.

== See also ==
- Roman expeditions to Sub-Saharan Africa
