= Algeria in the Middle Ages =

The Age of the Caliphs Under Islamic prophet Muhammad, 622-632 Rashidun Caliphate, 632-661 Umayyad Caliphate, 661-750

Medieval Muslim Algeria was a period of Muslim dominance in Algeria during the Middle Ages, spanning the millennium from the 7th century to the 17th century. The new faith, in its various forms, would penetrate nearly all segments of society, bringing with it armies, learned men, and fervent mystics; in large part, it would replace tribal practices and loyalties with new social norms and political idioms.

The first Arab military expeditions into the Maghreb, between 642 and 669, resulted in the spread of Islam and migration of Arabs to the Maghreb. These early forays from a base in Egypt occurred under local initiative rather than under orders from the central caliphate. When the seat of the caliphate moved from Medina to Damascus, the Umayyads (a Muslim dynasty ruling from 661 to 750) recognized that the strategic necessity of dominating the Mediterranean dictated a concerted military effort on the North African front. In 670, therefore, an Arab army under Uqba ibn Nafi established the town of Al-Qayrawan about 160 kilometers south of present-day Tunis and used it as a base for further operations.

== Abu al Muhajir Dinar ==
Abu al-Muhajir Dinar, Uqba's successor, pushed westward into Algeria and eventually worked out a modus vivendi with Kusaila, the ruler of an extensive confederation of Christian Berbers. Kusaila, who had been based in Tilimsan (Tlemcen), became a Muslim and moved his headquarters to Takirwan, near Al Qayrawan.

This harmony was short-lived, however. Arab and Berber forces controlled the region in turn until 697. By 711, Umayyad forces helped by Berber converts to Islam had conquered all of North Africa. Governors appointed by the Umayyad caliphs ruled from Al Qayrawan, capital of the new wilaya (province) of Ifriqiya, which covered Tripolitania (the western part of present-day Libya), Tunisia, and eastern Algeria.

Paradoxically, the spread of Islam among the Berbers did not guarantee their support for the Arab-dominated caliphate. The ruling Arabs alienated the Berbers by taxing them heavily; treating converts as second-class Muslims; and, at worst, by enslaving them. As a result, widespread opposition took the form of open revolt in 739–40 under the banner of Kharijite Islam. The Kharijites objected to Ali, the fourth caliph, making peace with the Umayyads in 657 and left Ali's camp (khariji means "those who leave"). The Kharijites had been fighting Umayyad rule in the East, and many Berbers were attracted by the sect's egalitarian precepts. For example, according to Kharijism, any suitable Muslim candidate could be elected caliph without regard to race, station, or descent from Muhammad.

After the revolt, Kharijites established several theocratic tribal kingdoms, most of which had short and troubled histories. Others, however, like Sijilmasa and Tilimsan, which straddled the principal trade routes, proved more viable and prospered. In 750 the Abbasids, who succeeded the Umayyads as Muslim rulers, moved the caliphate to Baghdad and reestablished caliphal authority in Ifriqiya, appointing Ibrahim ibn al Aghlab as governor in Al Qayrawan. Although nominally serving at the caliph's pleasure, Al Aghlab and his successors, the Aghlabids, ruled independently until 909, presiding over a court that became a center for learning and culture.

== Rustamids ==
Rustamids or Banou Rostom, an Ibadi Islamic berber state, appeared in 776 AD, founded and led initially by Abdurrahman ibn Rostom. Its capital was Tahert in the northeast of what is now known as Algeria. The Rustamid state spread all over the north African coast from Tlemcen to the area now known as Sert in northern Libya, though it is slightly hard to get precise frontiers of this state. During the Rostomid ruling, its capital was a cultural and a scientific metropolis of the Great Maghreb, attracting many scientists, such as Ibn Khaldoun, where he wrote his popular book called "Al Mukadima", which was likely to be known as the first book about sociology. The fall of the state was after the defeat against the Fatimids and putting out the last leader, Yakdan Ibn Mohamed, in 909 AD.

== Banu Ifran ==
In Algeria, Tlemcen was the capital of the Kingdom of Banu Ifran in the time period before Islam to 1068. The Banu Ifran waged uprisings against the foreign occupiers: the Romans, the Vandals, and the Byzantines. They pledged to the side of Kahina against the Umayyads in the 7th century. In the 8th century, they mobilized around the dogma of sufri to revolt against the powers of the Umayyads and Abbasids. In the 10th century, they created a dynasty facing the Fatimids, the Zirid, the Umayyad, the Hammadid, and the Maghraoua. The Banu Ifran was defeated by the Almoravids and the coalition of Banu Hilal and Banu Sulaym - Hammadid, towards the end of 11th century. The Ifrenides dynasty was recognized as the only dynasty that defended the native African people in the Maghreb.

== Zirids ==
The Zirid Dynasty, which ruled over parts of North Africa from the 10th to the 12th century, was one of the most significant Muslim dynasties in medieval Algeria. Founded by the Berber general Ziri ibn Manad, the Zirids established their capital in the city of Ashir, located in modern-day Algeria. The dynasty's early years were marked by political turmoil and conflict with other Muslim powers, but the Zirids eventually emerged as a dominant force in the region, with their influence extending as far as Sicily. The Zirid rulers were known for their patronage of the arts and sciences, and their court was a center of learning and culture. However, the dynasty's decline in the 12th century paved the way for the rise of other powers in the region, ultimately leading to the fragmentation of North Africa. Despite their relatively short reign, the legacy of the Zirids continues to shape the cultural and political landscape of Algeria and North Africa to this day.

== Fatimids ==
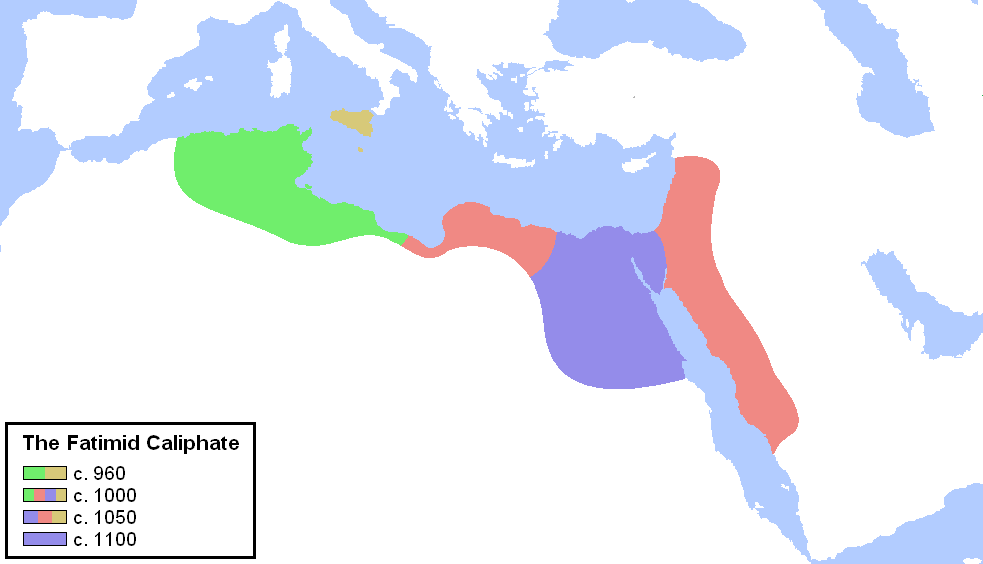

In the closing decades of the 9th century, missionaries of the Ismaili sect of Shia Islam converted the Kutama Berbers of what was later known as the Petite Kabylie region and led them in battle against the Sunni rulers of Ifriqiya. Al Qayrawan fell to them in 909. The Ismaili imam, Abdallah, declared himself caliph and established Mahdia as his capital. Abdallah initiated the Fatimid Dynasty, named after Fatima, daughter of Muhammad and wife of Ali, from whom the caliph claimed descent.

The Fatimids turned westward in 911, destroying the imamate of Tahert and conquering Sijilmasa in Morocco. Ibadi Kharijite refugees from Tahert fled south to the oasis at Ouargla beyond the Atlas Mountains, whence in the 11th century they moved southwest to Oued M'zab. Maintaining their cohesion and beliefs over the centuries, Ibadi religious leaders have dominated public life in the region to this day.

For many years, the Fatimids posed a threat to Morocco, but their deepest ambition was to rule the East, the Mashriq, which included Egypt and Muslim lands beyond. By 969, they had conquered Egypt and in 972, the Fatimid ruler Al Muizz established the new city of Cairo as his capital. The Fatimids left the rule of Ifriqiya and most of Algeria to the Zirids (972–1148). This Berber dynasty, which had founded the towns of Miliana, Médéa, and Algiers and centered significant local power in Algeria for the first time, turned over its domain west of Ifriqiya to the Banu Hammad branch of its family. The Hammadids ruled from 1011 to 1151, during which time Bejaïa became the most important port in North Africa.

This period was marked by constant conflict, political instability, and economic decline. The Hammadids, by rejecting the Ismaili doctrine for Sunni orthodoxy and renouncing submission to the Fatimids, initiated chronic conflict with the Zirids. Two great Berber confederations – the Sanhaja and the Zenata – engaged in an epic struggle. The fiercely brave, camelborne nomads of the western desert and steppe as well as the sedentary farmers of the Kabylie to the east swore allegiance to the Sanhaja. Their traditional enemies, the Zenata, were tough, resourceful horsemen from the cold plateau of the northern interior of Morocco and the western Tell in Algeria.

In addition, raiders from Genoa, Pisa, and Norman Sicily attacked ports and disrupted coastal trade. Trans-Saharan trade shifted to Fatimid Egypt and to routes in the west leading to Spanish markets. The countryside was being overtaxed by growing cities.

Contributing to these political and economic dislocations was a large incursion of Arab beduin from Egypt starting in the first half of the 11th century. Part of this movement was an invasion by the Banu Hilal and Banu Sulaym tribes, apparently sent by the Fatimids to weaken the Zirids. These Arab beduin overcame the Zirids and Hammadids and in 1057 sacked Al Qayrawan. They sent farmers fleeing from the fertile plains to the mountains and left cities and towns in ruin.

For the first time, the extensive use of Arabic spread to the countryside. Many sedentary Berbers who sought protection from the Hilalians were gradually Arabized.

== Almoravids ==
The Almoravid movement developed early in the 11th century among the Sanhaja confederation, whose control of trans-Saharan trade routes was under pressure from the Zenata Berbers in the north and the state of Ghana in the south. Yahya Ibn Ibrahim, a leader of the Godala tribe of the Sanhaja confederation, decided to raise the level of Islamic knowledge and practice among his people. To accomplish this, on his return from the hajj (Muslim pilgrimage to Mecca) in 1048–1049, he brought with him Abdallah Ibn Yasin, a Moroccan scholar. In the early years of the movement, the scholar was concerned only with imposing moral discipline and a strict adherence to Islamic principles among his followers. Abd Allah ibn Yasin also became known as one of the marabouts, or holy persons (from al murabitun, "those who have made a religious retreat").

The Almoravid movement shifted from promoting religious reform to engaging in military conquest after 1054 and was led by Lamtuna leaders: first Yahya, then his brother Abu Bakr, and then his cousin Yusuf ibn Tashfin. With Marrakesh as their capital, the Almoravids had conquered Morocco, the Maghrib as far east as Algiers, and Spain up to the Ebro River by 1106. Under the Almoravids, the Maghrib and Spain acknowledged the spiritual authority of the Abbasid caliphate in Baghdad, reuniting them temporarily with the Islamic community in the Mashriq.

Although it was not an entirely peaceful time, North Africa benefited economically and culturally during the Almoravid period, which lasted until 1147. Muslim Spain (Andalus in Arabic) was a great source of artistic and intellectual inspiration. The most famous writers of Andalus worked in the Almoravid court, and the builders of the Grand Mosque of Tilimsan, completed in 1136, used as a model the Grand Mosque of Córdoba.

== Almohads ==
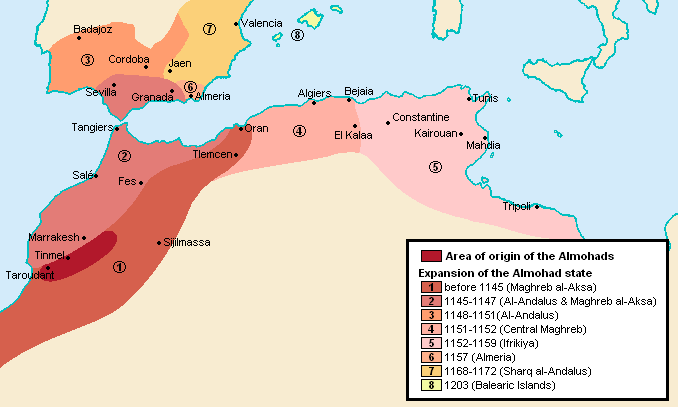
Almohad Empire 1121-1269

Like the Almoravids, the Almohads found their initial inspiration in Islamic reform. Their spiritual leader, the Moroccan Muhammad ibn Abdallah ibn Tumart, sought to reform Almoravid decadence. Rejected in Marrakesh and other cities, he turned to his Masmuda tribe in the Atlas Mountains for support. Because of their emphasis on the unity of God, his followers were known as Al Muwahhidun (unitarians, or Almohads).

Although declaring himself mahdi, imam, and masum (infallible leader sent by God), Muhammad ibn Abdallah ibn Tumart consulted with a council of ten of his oldest disciples. Influenced by the Berber tradition of representative government, he later added an assembly composed of fifty leaders from various tribes. The Almohad rebellion began in 1125 with attacks on Moroccan cities, including Sous and Marrakesh.

Upon Muhammad ibn Abdallah ibn Tumart's death in 1130, his successor Abd al Mumin took the title of caliph and placed members of his own family in power, converting the system into a traditional monarchy. The Almohads entered Spain at the invitation of the Andalusian amirs, who had risen against the Almoravids there. Abd al Mumin forced the submission of the amirs and reestablished the caliphate of Córdoba, giving the Almohad sultan supreme religious as well as political authority within his domains. The Almohads took control of Morocco in 1146, captured Algiers around 1151, and by 1160 had completed the conquest of the central Maghrib and advanced to Tripolitania. Nonetheless, pockets of Almoravid resistance continued to hold out in the Kabylie for at least fifty years.

After Abd al Mumin's death in 1163, his son Abu Yaqub Yusuf (r. 1163–84) and grandson Yaqub al Mansur (r. 1184–99) presided over the zenith of Almohad power. For the first time, the Maghrib was united under a local regime, and although the empire was troubled by conflict on its fringes, handcrafts and agriculture flourished at its center and an efficient bureaucracy filled the tax coffers. In 1229, the Almohad court renounced the teachings of Ibn Tumart, opting instead for greater tolerance of opposing views. As evidence of this change, the Almohads hosted two of the greatest thinkers of Andalus: Abu Bakr ibn Tufayl and Ibn Rushd (Averroes).

The Almohads shared the crusading instincts of their Castilian adversaries, but the continuing wars in Spain overtaxed their resources. In the Maghrib, the Almohad position was compromised by factional strife and was challenged by a renewal of tribal warfare. The Bani Merin (Zenata Berbers) took advantage of declining Almohad power to establish a tribal state in Morocco, initiating nearly sixty years of warfare there that concluded with their capture of Marrakesh, the last Almohad stronghold, in 1271. Despite repeated efforts to subjugate the central Maghrib, however, the Marinids were never able to restore the frontiers of the Almohad Empire.

== Zayyanids ==
From its capital at Tunis, the Hafsid dynasty made good its claim to be the legitimate successor of the Almohads in Ifriqiya, while, in the central Maghrib, the Zayyanids founded a dynasty that ruled the Kingdom of Tlemcen. Based on a Zenata tribe, the Bani Abd el Wad, which had been settled in the region by Abd al Mumin, the Zayyanids also emphasized their links with the Almohads.

For more than 300 years, until the region came under Ottoman suzerainty in the 16th century, the Zayyanids kept a tenuous hold in the central Maghrib. The regime, which depended on the administrative skills of Andalusians, was plagued by frequent rebellions but learned to survive as the vassal of the Marinids or Hafsids or later as an ally of Spain.

Many coastal cities defied the ruling dynasties and asserted their autonomy as municipal republics. They were governed by their merchant oligarchies, by tribal chieftains from the surrounding countryside, or by the privateers who operated out of their ports.

Tlemcen prospered as a commercial center and was called the "pearl of the Maghrib." Situated at the head of the Imperial Road through the strategic Taza Gap to Marrakesh, the city controlled the caravan route to Sijilmasa, gateway for the gold and slave trade with the western Sudan. Aragon came to control commerce between Tlemcen's port, Oran, and Europe beginning about 1250. An outbreak of privateering out of Aragon, however, severely disrupted this trade after about 1420.

== Marabouts ==
The successor dynasties in North Africa—Marinids, Zayanids, and Hasfids—did not base their power on a program of religious reform as their predecessors had done. Of necessity, they compromised with rural cults that had survived the triumph of puritanical orthodoxy in the 12th century despite the efforts of the Almoravids and Almohads to stamp them out.

The aridity of official Islam had little appeal outside the mosques and schools of the cities. In the countryside, wandering marabouts, or holy people, drew a large and devoted following. These men and women were believed to possess divine grace (baraka) or to be able to channel it to others. In life, the marabouts offered spiritual guidance, arbitrated disputes, and often wielded political power. After death, their cults—some local, others widespread—erected domed tombs that became sites of pilgrimage.

Many tribes claimed descent from marabouts. In addition, small, autonomous republics led by holy men became a common form of government in the Maghrib. In Algeria, the influence of the marabouts continued through much of the Ottoman period, when the authorities would grant political and financial favors to these leaders to prevent tribal uprisings.

== European offensive ==
The final triumph of the 700-year Christian reconquest of Spain, marked by the fall of Granada in 1492, was accompanied by the forced conversion of Spanish Muslims (Moriscos). As a result of the Inquisition, thousands of Jews fled or were deported to the Maghrib where many gained influence in government and commerce.

Without much difficulty, Christian Spain imposed its influence on the Maghrib coast by constructing fortified outposts (presidios) and collecting tribute during the 15th and early 16th centuries. On or near the Algerian coast, Spain took control of Mers el Kebir in 1505, Oran in 1509, and Tlemcen, Mostaganem, and Ténès, all west of Algiers, in 1510. In the same year, the merchants of Algiers handed over one of the rocky islets in their harbor, where the Spaniards built a fort. The presidios in North Africa turned out to be a costly and largely ineffective military endeavor that did not guarantee access for Spain's merchant fleet. Indeed, most trade seemed to be transacted in the numerous free ports. Moreover, from the 16th to the 18th century, sailing superior ships and hammering out shrewd concessions, merchants from England, Portugal, the Netherlands, France, and Italy, as well as Spain, dominated Mediterranean trade.

Why Spain did not extend its North African conquests much beyond a few modest enclaves has puzzled historians. Some suggest that Spain held back because it was preoccupied with maintaining its territory in Italy; others that Spain's energies were absorbed in obtaining the riches of the New World. Still another possibility is that Spain was more intent on projecting its force on the high seas than on risking defeat in the forbidding interior of Africa.

== Privateers ==
Privateering was an age-old practice in the Mediterranean. North African rulers engaged in it increasingly in the late 16th and early 17th century because it was so lucrative, and because their merchant vessels, formerly a major source of income, were not permitted to enter European ports. Although the methods varied, privateering generally involved private vessels raiding the ships of an enemy in peacetime under the authority of a ruler. Its purposes were to disrupt an opponent's trade and to reap rewards from the captives and cargo.

Privateering was a highly disciplined affair conducted under the command of the rais (captains) of the fleets. Several captains became heroes in Algerian lore for their bravery and skill. The captains of the corsairs banded together in a self-regulating taifa (community) to protect and further the corporate interests of their trade. The taifa came to be ethnically mixed, incorporating those captured Europeans who agreed to convert to Islam and supply information useful for future raids. The taifa also gained prestige and political influence because of its role in fighting the infidel and providing the merchants and rulers of Algiers with a major source of income. Algiers became the privateering city-state par excellence, especially between 1560 and 1620. And it was two privateer brothers who were instrumental in extending Ottoman influence in Algeria.

== See also ==
- Second Barbary War
- History of Islam
- Islam in Algeria

== Sources ==
- Original text: Library of Congress Country Study of Algeria
