= Waggag ibn Zallu al-Lamti =

11th-century Maghrebi Muslim scholar

Personal life
- Born: Sous
- Died: 11th century Aglu, near Tiznit
- Resting place: Dar al-Murabitin Ribat, Aglu, Morocco
- Era: 11th century
- Main interest: Islamic jurisprudence
- Notable idea: Founding Ribat al-Murabitin
- Known for: Religious teacher and spiritual leader of Abdallah ibn Yasin, founder of the Almoravid Dynasty
- Occupation: Islamic scholar, Jurist

Religious life
- Religion: Islam
- Creed: Maliki

Muslim leader
- Influenced by: Abu Imran al-Fasi
- Influenced: Abdallah ibn Yasin, Sulayman ibn Addu, Abu al-Qacem ibn Addu

Waggag ibn Zallu al-Lamti (Arabic: وجاج بن زلو اللمطي, romanized: Wajāj ibn Zalw al-Lamṭī) (died 11th-century in Aglu near Tiznit, in present-day Morocco) was a Maliki scholar and jurist who lived in the 11th century. He was a disciple of Abu Imran al-Fasi and belonged to the Lamtuna clan, which is a Sanhaja-Berber tribe. Waggag had an eminent role in the rise of the Almoravid dynasty as he was the religious teacher and spiritual leader of Abdallah ibn Yasin, the founder of the dynasty.

== Transliteration of the name ==
Various transliteration of the name exist such as Wajjaj Ibn Zelu or Wajaj Ibn Zelwa. This is due to the fact that there is no letter for the G sound in Arabic, besides the letter غ which is the G letter in Arabic with G sound of an English letter G, so the name was alternately written with a "ج"(j) or a "ك" (k). The "u" vowel sound is written with a "و" which can also be read as a "w" sound.

== Life ==
He was a native of the Sous region and traveled to al-Qarawiyin, where he studied under Abu Imran al-Fasi. He then went to the Sous where he founded a Ribat in the village of Aglu (located near Tiznit) named Ribat al-Murabitin where he took disciples and taught the Maliki doctrine.

After receiving a letter for his former teacher Abu Imran al-Fasi asking him to help teach religion to the southern Sanhaja Saharan tribes, he chose Abdallah ibn Yasin, to accompany the Gudala leader Yahya ibn Ibrahim to the Sahara. Waggag ibn Zallu then became the spiritual guide of the Almoravid's first leader.

In relation to the Almoravid movement, some historical chronicles (e.g. al-Bakri, Ibn Abi Zar, Qadi Ayyad) give him credit in asking Abdallah ibn Yassin to fight those who disobeyed him and then commanded him to advance north to take Sijilmasa which transformed the Almoravid religious movement into a military one with much greater ambitions. It was also reported that after the death of Abdallah Ibn Yasin, only the disciples of Waggag ibn Zallu were eligible to be appointed as religious authoritative leaders.

A hagiography of Waggag ibn Zallu was written by Ibn al-Zayyat al-Tadili. He is buried at the Dar al-Murabitin Ribat in Aglu a village near Tiznit, Morocco where his grave became a shrine known as "Sidi Waggag".

The brothers Sulayman ibn Addu and Abu al-Qacem ibn Addu, who were the successors of Ibn Yassin as Almoravid's religious leaders were his disciples.

== See also ==
- Ibn Tumart
- Yusuf ibn Tashfin
