= Yahya ibn Umar al-Lamtuni =

Berber chieftain

Abu Zakariyya Yahya ibn Umar
- أبو زكرياء يحيى بن عمر
- Born: Abu Zakariyya Yahya ibn Umar ibn Talagagin ibn Turgut ibn Wartasin
- Military career
- Allegiance: Almoravid movement

Abu Zakariyya Yahya ibn Umar ibn Talagagin ibn Turgut ibn Wartasin, commonly known as Yahya ibn Umar al-Lamtuni al-Sanhaji (died 1056 near Azuggi; Arabic: يحيى بن عمر), was a chieftain of the Lamtuna, a tribe of the Sanhaja confederation, and the second emir of the Almoravid movement. He succeeded Yahya Ibn Ibrahim, who had helped establish the movement in collaboration with the religious leader Abdallah ibn Yasin. Yahya led the Almoravid armies during their early campaigns, including the captures of Sijilmassa and Awdaghost in 1054–1055. He was killed in battle against a dissident Berber faction in the Adrar Plateau, and was succeeded as Almoravid emir by his brother, Abu Bakr ibn Umar.

Yahya ibn Umar played an important role in the early expansion of the Almoravid movement across the western Sahara and the southern Maghreb. Under his leadership, the Almoravid forces defeated or subdued several local Berber groups and established control over important trading centers. His campaigns helped lay the foundations for the later expansion of the Almoravid state under his brother, Abu Bakr ibn Umar.

== Background ==
In the 11th century, the Sanhaja were divided into several tribes - the Lamtuna, the Massufa, the Banu Warith and the Gudala (or Judala). After their conversion to Islam during the 9th century, the Sanhaja desert tribes were united and, with the zeal of neophyte converts, launched a series of campaigns (jihad) against the "Sudanese" (pagan black peoples of sub-Saharan Africa). The Sanhaja union carved out a vast Saharan desert empire. After the Sanhaja union collapsed, most of their old dominions - particularly the citadels, caravan stops and oases on the lucrative trans-Saharan trade routes - were lost to the Ghana Empire to the south, and to the Zenata Maghrawa rulers of Sijilmassa to the north.

The chronicles trace Yahya's lineage back to the Lamtuna chieftain Turgut ibn Wartasin (by full patronymic record, Yahya ibn Umar ibn Ibrahim (alias Talagagin) ibn Turgut ibn Wartasin al-Lamtuni Like many of the leading Lamtuna chieftains, Yahya ibn Umar longed to recreate the old Sanhaja union and recover their lost dominions.

The opportunity seemed to arise in the late 1040s, after the death of Yahya ibn Ibrahim, the chieftain of the neighboring Godala tribe, and high chief of the Sanhaja confederation. The desert Sanhaja had matrilineal succession rules, and Yahya ibn Umar's mother was a Godala princess. Although only one of several candidates, Yahya ibn Umar succeeded in being elected the new high Sanhaja chief, a selection which provoked the resentment of the Godala, who had hoped for one of their own.

Ibn Umar's succession was endorsed by Abdallah ibn Yasin, a Maliki jurist and fiery puritan preacher, who had been staying as a guest of the Gudala, and it is possibly on account of this that Ibn Yasin was expelled by the Gudala. Probably sensing the useful organizing power of Ibn Yasin's pious fervor, Yahya ibn Umar invited him to stay among the Lamtuna. Yahya attached himself closely to Ibn Yasin, and a productive relationship was forged between the two men.

Invoking stories of the early life of Muhammad, Ibn Yasin preached that conquest was a necessary addendum to Islamicization, that it was not enough merely to adhere to God's law, but necessary to also destroy opposition to it. And tribalism, Ibn Yasin declared, was against God's law. Therefore, it is the religious duty of Muslims to set aside their tribal differences, and establish a new polity under the Sacred Law. For Yahya ibn Umar and the Lamtuna chieftains, Ibn Yasin's ideology dovetailed into their long desire to recreate their old Saharan empire, giving their worldly ambitions the legitimacy of Islamic authority and religious imperative.

== Almoravid emir ==
Ibn Yasin and Yahya collaborated in the leadership of this new movement - soon to be called "the Almoravids". Abdallah ibn Yasin was the religious imam and ideological leader of the movement, Yahya ibn Umar the overall military commander, and thus the first Almoravid emir. Chronicler Qadi Ayyad claims that Yahya ibn Umar was the first to use the title amir al-muslimin ("Prince of the Muslims"), that would thereafter be used by Almoravid rulers.

Fired up by religious fervor, in the early 1050s, the Lamtuna launched a series of campaigns against the neighboring tribes to persuade them - by force if need be - to join the new Sanhaja union. Under Yahya's leadership, the Lamtuna armies successfully brought the other Sanhaja desert tribes - the Massufa, the Banu Warith and even the wary Gudala - over to the new "cause". Once united, the Almoravids set about seizing the old trans-Saharan routes and stations. But their rivals were not about to cede control so readily. The Zenata Maghrawa rulers of Sijilmassa pulled on their connections and clients in the desert to spoil the Almoravid efforts to unite the Sanhaja. After various entanglements with client armies, Yahya soon determined that the best strategy was to strike the troublemaker behind the troublemakers. In 1054 (or 1055), Yahya led his desert Sanhaja armies against Sijilmassa, defeated the Maghrawa lord and captured the city. The fall of opulent and powerful Sijilmassa to a makeshift army of rustic desert puritans was unexpected and shocked many contemporaries.

With Sijilmassa apparently under control, Yahya turned his army south and headed against the Ghana Empire. The Almoravids seized the critical citadel of Awdaghost on the southern end of the trans-Saharan route. But news soon arrived that the Zenata had recovered Sijilmassa and expelled the Almoravid garrison. Yahya determined on a forced march back north to recover the city, but the Godala suddenly decided to call it quits, and broke away from the Almoravid coalition. This presented Yahya with the troubling prospect of a hostile force to his rear if he pressed on north. In a fateful decision, the Almoravids decided to partition their forces - Yahya would lead a campaign against the lands of the Gudala (littoral Mauritania) and drag them back by force into the union, while instructing his brother Abu Bakr to take a holding force north and keep the Zenata of Sijilmassa in check.

== Battle of Tabfarilla ==
Yahya headed as far as the Almoravid frontier fortress of Azuggi, in the Adrar Plateau of central Mauritania. Feeling he had insufficient forces to take on the Godala by himself, Yahya called upon his new ally, the king of Takrur, for assistance (Takrur, a kingdom on the Senegal River, had allied with the Almoravids during the attack on Ghana). A large Takruri force under Labi came to join up with Yahya in the Adrar, but the Gudala struck first. Before the Takruri force managed to reach him, the Godala army bore down on Azuggi, trapping Yahya's smaller force and forcing a pitched battle. The Godala destroyed the Almoravid army at the Battle of Tabfarilla in March–April 1056. Yahya ibn Umar was killed in the field of battle.

== Aftermath ==
Yahya's brief career as the first Almoravid emir came to a premature end. After his death, Abdallah ibn Yasin immediately appointed Yahya's brother, Abu Bakr ibn Umar, to succeed him as the new Almoravid emir. Under Abu Bakr's leadership, the Almoravids would re-conquer Sijilmassa, and go on to a spectacular career, conquering most of the rest of Morocco in the 1070s and eventually come back down to finish off what remained of Ghana in the 1080s.

Chroniclers report that Yahya ibn Umar had three sons - Muhammad, Ali and Isa. Their exact fate is unknown, but it seems their uncle, Abu Bakr ibn Umar, did not forget them. Around 1057, not long after recovering the city, Abu Bakr appointed his nephew Ali ibn Yahya as the Almoravid governor of the Sijilmassa, a post he seems to have held down to 1069. Upon his death in 1087, Abu Bakr partitioned his dominions (covering the southern half of the Almoravid empire) not only among his own sons, but also among the sons of Yahya.

== Sources ==
- Levtzion, N. (1973) Ancient Ghana and Mali. London: Methuen.
- Levtzion, N. and J.F.P. Hopkins, editors, (1981) Corpus of Early Arabic Sources for West African History, Cambridge, UK" Cambridge University Press. 2000 edition
- Lewicki, T. (1988) "The Role of the Sahara and Saharians in relationships between north and south", in M. Elfasi, editor, General History of Africa, Africa from the Seventh to the Eleventh Century, UNESCO. 1992 ed., ch.11, p. 276-313.
- Messier, R.A. (2010) The Almoravids and the Meanings of Jihad. Santa Barbara, Calif.: Praeger.

Preceded by Abdallah ibn Yasin and Yahya ibn Ibrahim	Almoravid (along with Abdallah ibn Yasin); 1046–1056	Succeeded by Abdallah ibn Yasin and Abu Bakr ibn Umar
