= Abu Bakr ibn Umar =

أبو بكر بن عمر Abu Bakr ibn Umar
- Amir Al-Muslimin
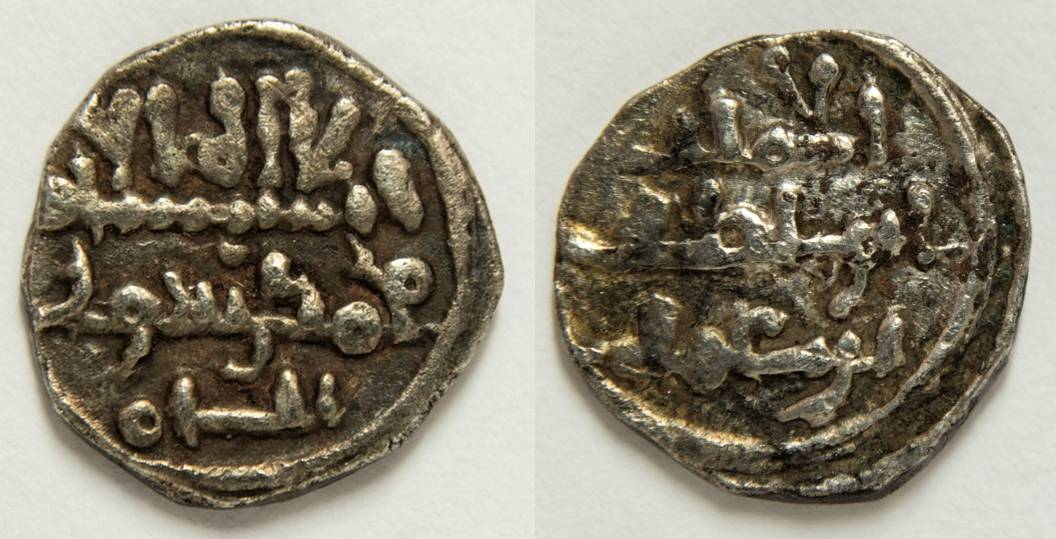
- Coin minted under Abu Bakr ibn Umar

Amir of the Almoravids
- Reign: 1056 – 1087
- Predecessor: Yahya ibn Umar
- Successor: Yusuf ibn Tashfin
- Partitioned rule: 1072 – 1087
- Co-ruler: Yusuf ibn Tashfin (1072 - 1087)
- Died: 1087; Tagant
- Spouse: Zaynab an-Nafzawiyyah (m. 1068; div. 1071); Fâtimata Sal (c.1086)
- Issue: Amadou ben Boubakar
Names
- Abu Bakr ben Umar ben Ibrahim ben Turgut al-Lamtuni
- Father: Umar ben Ibrahim al-Lamtuni
- Mother: Safiya al-Djedaliya
- Religion: Islam

Abu Bakr ibn Umar ibn Ibrahim ibn Turgut, sometimes suffixed al-Sanhaji or al-Lamtuni (died 1087; Arabic: أبو بكر بن عمر اللمتوني, romanized: Abū Bakr ibn 'Umar al Lamtūnī) was a chieftain of the Lamtuna Berber Tribe and Amir of the Almoravids from 1056 until his death. He is credited to have founded the Moroccan city of Marrakesh, and under his rule the heretic Barghawatas were destroyed. His campaigns may have included attacking the Ghana Empire, although the Almoravid impact on and relationship with sub-Saharan states is disputed amongst historians. In November of 1087, Abu Bakr died of a poisoned arrow in what is now Mauritania.

== Background ==
Abu Bakr ibn Umar was a member of the Banu Turgut, a clan of the Lamtuna Berbers. His uncle, Yahya Ibn Ibrahim was the chieftain of the Lamtuna who, together with the Maliki scholar Abdallah ibn Yasin, launched the Almoravid (murabitūn) movement in the early 1040s.

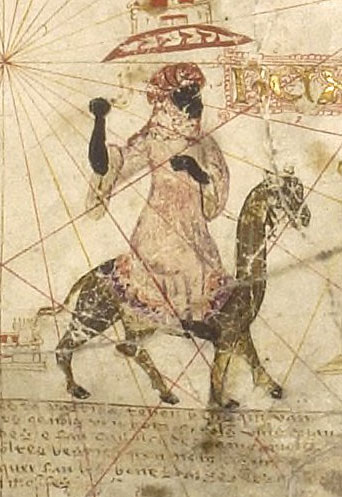
Possible depiction of Abu Bakr ibn Umar (labelled "Rex Bubecar"), in the 1413 portolan chart of Mecia de Viladestes

== Amir al-Muslimin ==
Upon the death of Yahya ibn Umar in the spring of 1056 at the Battle of Tabfarilla, the spiritual leader Abdallah ibn Yasin appointed Abu Bakr as the new military commander and amir of the Almoravids. That same year, Abu Bakr recaptured Sijilmassa from the Maghrawa of the Zenata confederation. The city had been taken earlier by Yahya, but subsequently lost; Abu Bakr recaptured it definitively for the Almoravids in late 1056.

In order to ensure they did not lose Sijilmassa again, Abu Bakr launched a campaign to secure the roads and valleys of southern Morocco. He immediately captured the Draa valley, then moved along the Wadi Nul (along the edge of the Anti-Atlas, picking up the adherence of the Sanhaja tribes of the Lamta and the Gazzula (Jazzula) to the Almoravid movement. Abu Bakr led the conquest of the Sous valley of southern Morocco, seizing the local capital of Taroudannt in 1057. By negotiation, Abdallah ibn Yasin secured an alliance with the Masmuda Berbers of the High Atlas, which allowed the Almoravids to cross the mountain range with little incident and seize the critical Zenata-ruled citadel of Aghmat in 1058 with little opposition. Delighted at the apparent ease of their advance, Abdallah ibn Yasin ventured into the lands of the Berghwata of western Morocco with only a light escort and was promptly killed. Abu Bakr, who was then mopping up the area north of Aghmat, wheeled the Almoravid army around and conquered the Berghwata in a brutal campaign of revenge.

The death of the spiritual leader Abdallah ibn Yasin left the Almoravids under the sole command of Abu Bakr. Abu Bakr continued carrying out the Almoravid program without assuming the pretence of religious authority in himself. Abu Bakr, like later Almoravid rulers, took up the comparatively modest title of amir al-Muslimin ("Prince of the Muslims"), rather than the caliphal amir al-Mu'minin ("Commander of the Faithful").

Abu Bakr married the wealthiest woman in Aghmat, Zaynab an-Nafzawiyyah, who helped him navigate the complicated politics of southern Morocco. But Abu Bakr, a rustic desert warrior, found crowded Aghmat and its courtly life stifling. In 1060/61, Abu Bakr and his Sanhaja lieutenants left the city and pitched their tents on the pastures along the Tensift River, setting up an encampment for their headquarters, as if they were back in the Sahara desert. Stone buildings would eventually replace the tents, and the encampment would become the city of Marrakesh, an unusual-seeming city for the time, evocative of desert life with planted palms and an oasis-like feel.

Abu Bakr placed his cousin Yusuf ibn Tashfin in charge of Aghmat, and assigned him the responsibility of maintaining the front against the Zenata to the north. In a series of campaigns through the 1060s, while Abu Bakr held court in Marrakesh, Yusuf directed Almoravid armies against northern Morocco, reducing Zenata strongholds one by one. In 1070, the Moroccan capital of Fez finally fell to the Almoravids. Discontent, however, had arisen in the Almoravid ranks.

== Return to the Desert ==
Many among the desert clans back in the Sahara regarded the northern campaigns as expensive and pointless. The Guddala tribe, who had earlier broken away from the Almoravid coalition, began urging other desert tribes to follow suit. After the fall of Fez, feeling Morocco was now secure, Abu Bakr decided it was time to return to the Sahara to quell the dissension in the desert homelands. He placed Yusuf ibn Tashfin in charge of Morocco in his absence. As was common among the Sanhaja tribes before extended military campaigns, Abu Bakr divorced Zaynab before he left, advising her to marry Yusuf if she needed protection.

Having quelled the discontent back in the Sahara, Abu Bakr returned north to Morocco in 1072. But Yusuf ibn Tashfin had enjoyed his taste of power, and was reluctant to give it up. Pushed by his new wife, Zaynab, Yusuf met Abu Bakr in the plain of Burnoose (between Marrakesh and Aghmat) and with a large outlay of gold, cattle and other gifts persuaded him to leave the northern dominions to him. As a courtesy to his former leader, Yusuf kept Abu-Bakr's name on the Almoravid coinage until his death.

Abu Bakr returned to the Sahara desert to command the southern wing of the Almoravids, raiding the pagan Sudan and perhaps attacking the Ghana Empire, although opinion among historians is divided over whether the Almoravids ever established dominion over their Sub-Saharan neighbors. If Ghana was in fact conquered, it was likely done by a son of Abu Bakr, Yahya, in 1076.

== Death ==
Mauritanian oral tradition claims Abu Bakr was killed in a clash with the "Gangara" (Soninke Wangara of the Tagant Region of southern Mauritania), relating that he was struck down by a poisoned arrow from an old, blind Gangara chieftain in the pass of Khma (between the Tagant and Assab mountains, en route to Ghana). His grave is at Maksam in Tagant region, it is 15 km from Quddiya on the outskirts of Tidjikja. According to Wolof oral tradition, a Serer bowman named Amar Godomat killed him near lake Rkiz (Godomat's name apparently originates with this death).

=== Dating ===
Following Ibn Abi Zar, Abu Bakr ibn Umar's death has been commonly dated to 1087. This is supported by numismatic evidence, with coins minted in Sijilmassa in Abu Bakr's name until that date. Ibn 'Idhari, however, records him dying only 3 years after his return to the desert, sometime in 1075 or 1076. The clear exaggerations in Ibn Abi Zar's account are perhaps a reason to view his dates with skepticism, as well as the fact that the campaign against Ghana was possibly led by Abu Bakr's son, Yahya.

No historian has yet accounted for the ease with which Almoravid historiography has appropriated Ibn Idhari's chronology—this, at the expense of that passed on by Ibn Abi Zar and Ibn Khaldun—at all junctures except the date he provides Abu Bakr's death.

== Legacy ==
Although records are sparse, Abu Bakr may have been succeeded as emir of the southern Almoravids by his son, establishing a dynasty that lasted 200 years.

Oral tradition records that at his death Abu Bakr left a pregnant Fula wife, Fâtimata Sal, who gave birth to a son, the legendary Amadou Boubakar ibn Omar, better known as Ndiadiane Ndiaye, who went on to found the Wolof kingdom of Waalo in the lower Senegal river and the Jolof Empire. The difference in dates between the two, however, make a direct connection impossible. More likely, Ndiaye was a descendant of Abu Bakr's, and one of several leaders who took power upon the dynasty's collapse.

== See also ==
- Islamic empires

== Sources ==
- Burkhalter, Sheryl (1992). "Listening for Silences in Almoravid History: Another Reading of "The Conquest That Never Was."". History in Africa. 19.
- Conrad, David; Fisher, Humphrey (1982). "The Conquest that Never was: Ghana and the Almoravids, 1076. I. The External Arabic Sources". History in Africa. 9.
- Ibn Idhari, Al-bayan al-mughrib Part III, annotated Spanish translation by A. Huici Miranda, Valencia, 1963.
- N. Levtzion & J.F.P. Hopkins, Corpus of early Arabic sources for West African history, Cambridge University Press, 1981, ISBN 0-521-22422-5 (reprint: Markus Wiener, Princeton, 2000, ISBN 1-55876-241-8). Contains English translations of extracts from medieval works dealing with the Almoravids; the selections cover some (but not all) of the information above.

Preceded by Yahya ibn Umar and Abdallah ibn Yasin	Almoravid (in the early days with Abdallah ibn Yasin); 1056–1087	Succeeded by Yusuf ibn Tashfin
