= Abu Imran al-Fasi =

11th-century Moroccan faqih

Abu 'Imran al-Fasi

Personal life
- Born: 974 Fes
- Died: June 8, 1039 Kairouan

Religious life
- Religion: Islam
- Denomination: Sunni
- Jurisprudence: Maliki
- Creed: Ash'ari

Muslim leader
- Influenced by: Imam Malik Sahnun Al-Baqillani
- Influenced: Waggag ibn Zallu al-Lamti Abdallah Ibn Yasin Almoravids Qadi Ayyad

Abū ʿImrān Mūsā ibn ʿĪsā ibn Abī 'l-Ḥājj (or Ḥajjāj) al-Fāsī (Arabic: أبو عمران موسى بن عيسى بن أبي الحاج الفاسي) (also simply known as Abū ʿImrān al-Fāsī; born between 975 and 978, died 8 June 1039) was a Maliki faqīh born at Fez to a Berber or Arab family whose nisba is impossible to reconstruct.

Abu ‘Imran al-Fasi was probably born between 975 and 978 at Fes. He went to Ifriqiya, where he settled in Kairouan and studied under al-Kabisi (died 1012). With al-Kabisi, he introduced the young Ibn Sharaf to poetry. Some time later, he stayed in Cordova with Ibn ‘Abd al-Barr and followed the lectures of various scholars there, which his biographers list. He is regarded a saint by later Sufi mystics. He played an important role in the history of the Almoravid dynasty. It was his teaching in Qayrawan (Tunisia) that first stirred Yahya ibn Ibrahim, who was returning from the Pilgrimage and attended Abu ‘Imran's courses. This inspired the foundation of the Almoravids. He wrote a commentary on the Mudawana of Sahnun.

Qadi Ayyad (d.544/1129), author of the Kitab Shifa bitarif huquq al-Mustapha (The Antidote in knowing the rights of the Chosen Prophet), hagiographied Abu ‘Imran al-Fasi in his Tadrib a-Madarik (Exercising Perception), an encyclopaedia of Maliki scholars.

== See also ==
- List of Ash'aris and Maturidis
- Waggag ibn Zallu al-Lamti
- Sidi Mahrez
