= Zaynab, la rose d'Aghmat =

- Directed by: Farida Bourquia
- Written by: Mohamed Mouncef El Kadiri
- Starring: Fatym Layachi, Mohamed Majd, Amina Rachid
- Cinematography: Ivan Oms Blanco
- Edited by: Adil Mimdal
- Release date: 2014
- Running time: 89 minutes
- Country: Morocco
- Language: Moroccan Arabic

Zaynab, la rose d'Aghmat is a 2014 film directed by Farida Bourquia. It was screened at the Festival National du Film in Tangier.

== Synopsis ==
The film follows Zaynab an-Nafzawiyyah, wife of Yusuf ibn Tashfin, founder of the city of Marrakech during the Almoravid era.

== Cast ==
- Mohamed Majd
- Fatym Layachi
- Amina Rachid
- Abdessalam Bouhssini
- Benissa El Jirari
- Mohamed Khouyi
- Farid Regragui
- Jamila Charik
