= Battle of Tabfarilla =

Military battle in present-day Mauritania

Date	21 March to 19 April 1056
Location	Tabfarilla, near Azougui, present day Mauritania 21°3′N 13°6′W
Result	Godala victory

Belligerents
Almoravids (Lamtuna); Takrur	Godala

Commanders and leaders
Yahya ibn Umar al-Lamtuni †; Lebi ibn War Jabi	Unknown
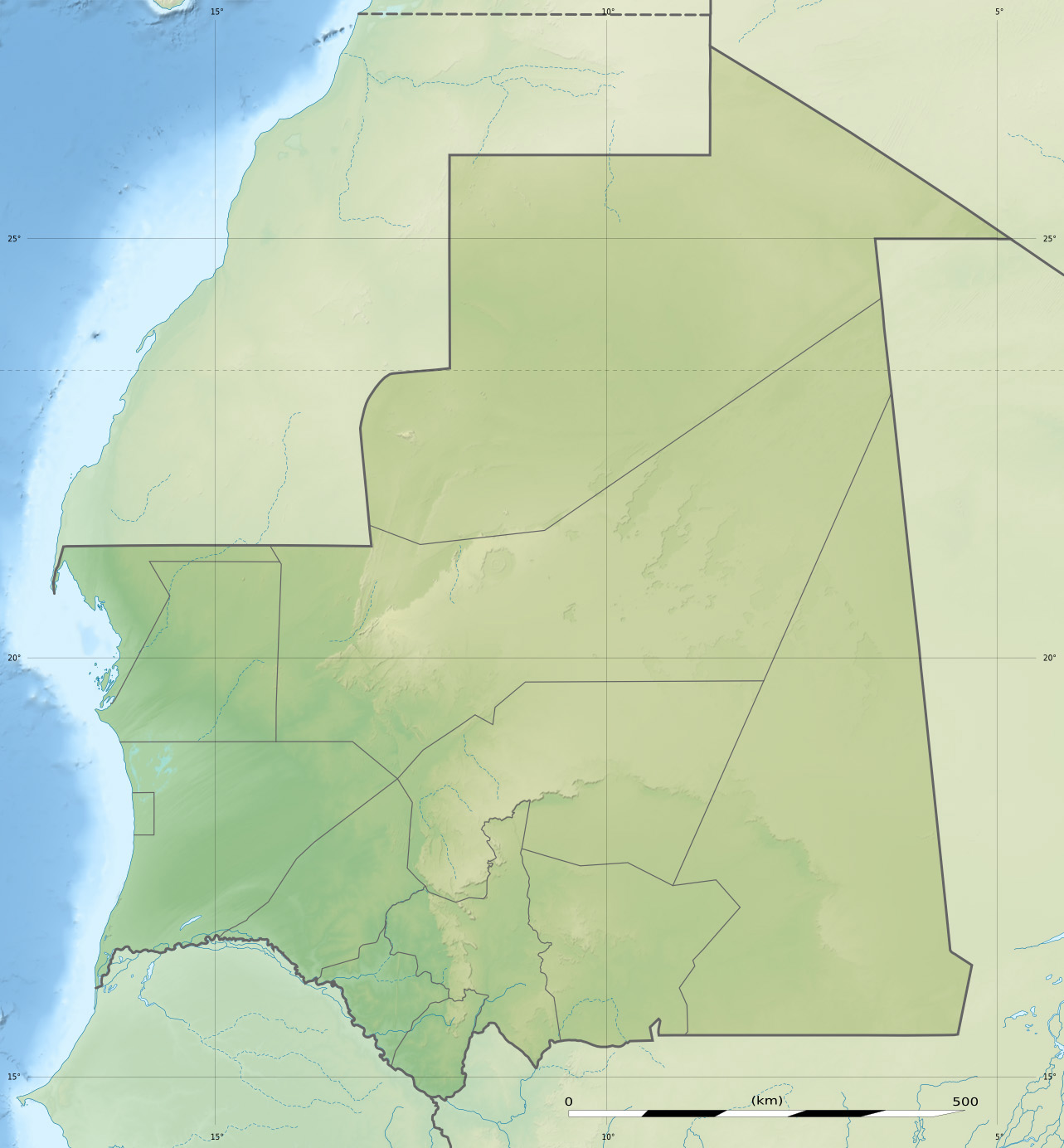
- Location of the battle of Tabfarilla

The Battle of Tabfarilla was a military conflict between the Lamtuna and the Godala. Both of them Muslim Berber Sanhaja tribes of the Sahara Desert and one time allies, the Lamtuna formed the core of the Almoravids after the Godala broke away. The Almoravid Emir Yahya ibn Umar al-Lamtuni was sent against the Godala.

The battle took place in the Sahara between 21 March and 19 April of 448 AH/1056 AD at a spot called Tabfarilla near Azougui in present-day central Mauritania. The battle continued until night. The Almoravids, although reinforced by the Takrurs, were defeated and Yahya ibn Umar was killed in the battlefield.

The geographer Abu Abdullah al-Bakri relates in his Book of Roads and Kingdoms a legend indicating that the battlefield of Tabfarilla was haunted by the calls of ghostly muezzin frightening looters and passersby as nightfall approached.
