= Tnine Aglou =

Tnine Aglou Aglou
- Rural commune and town
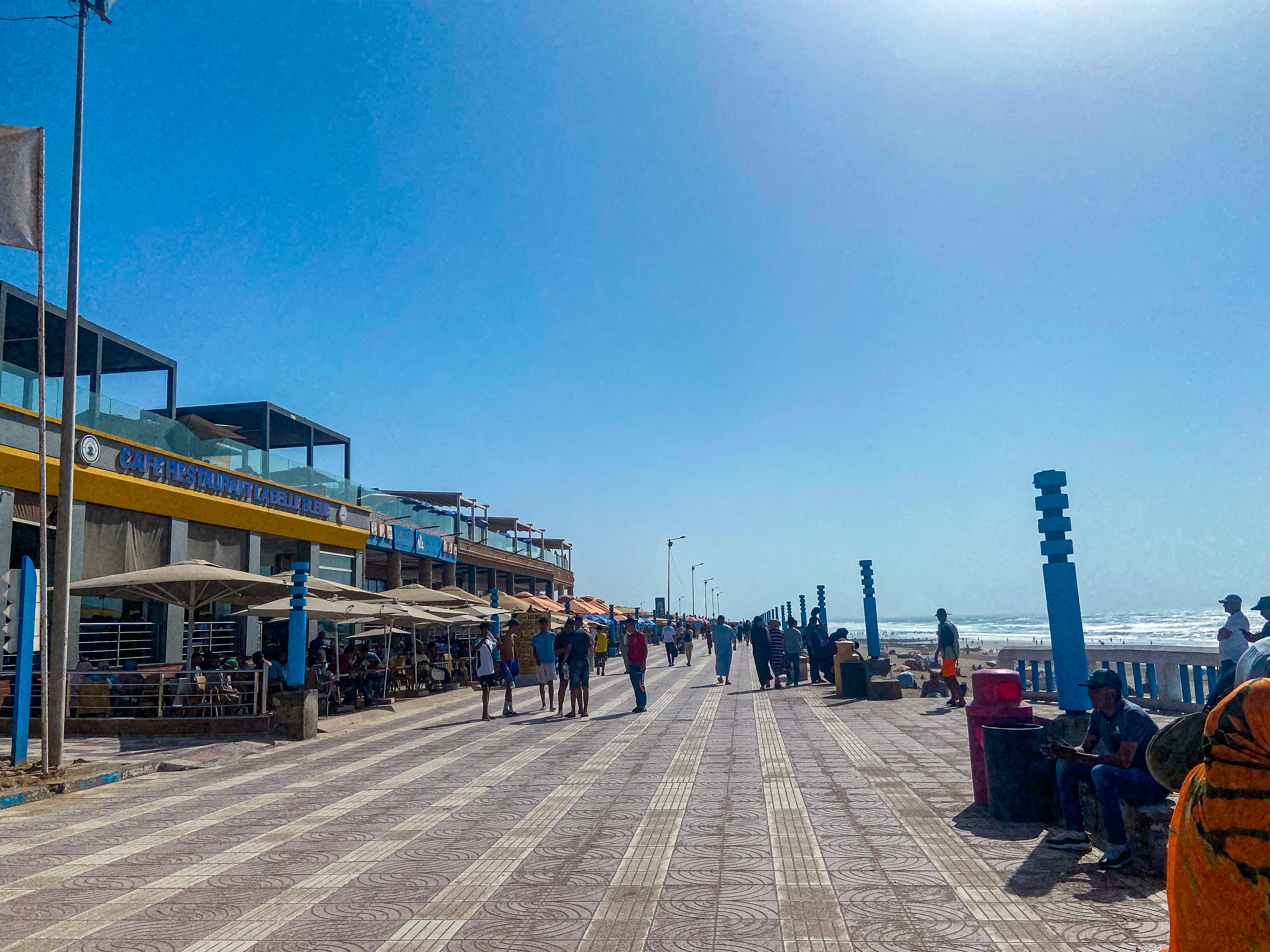
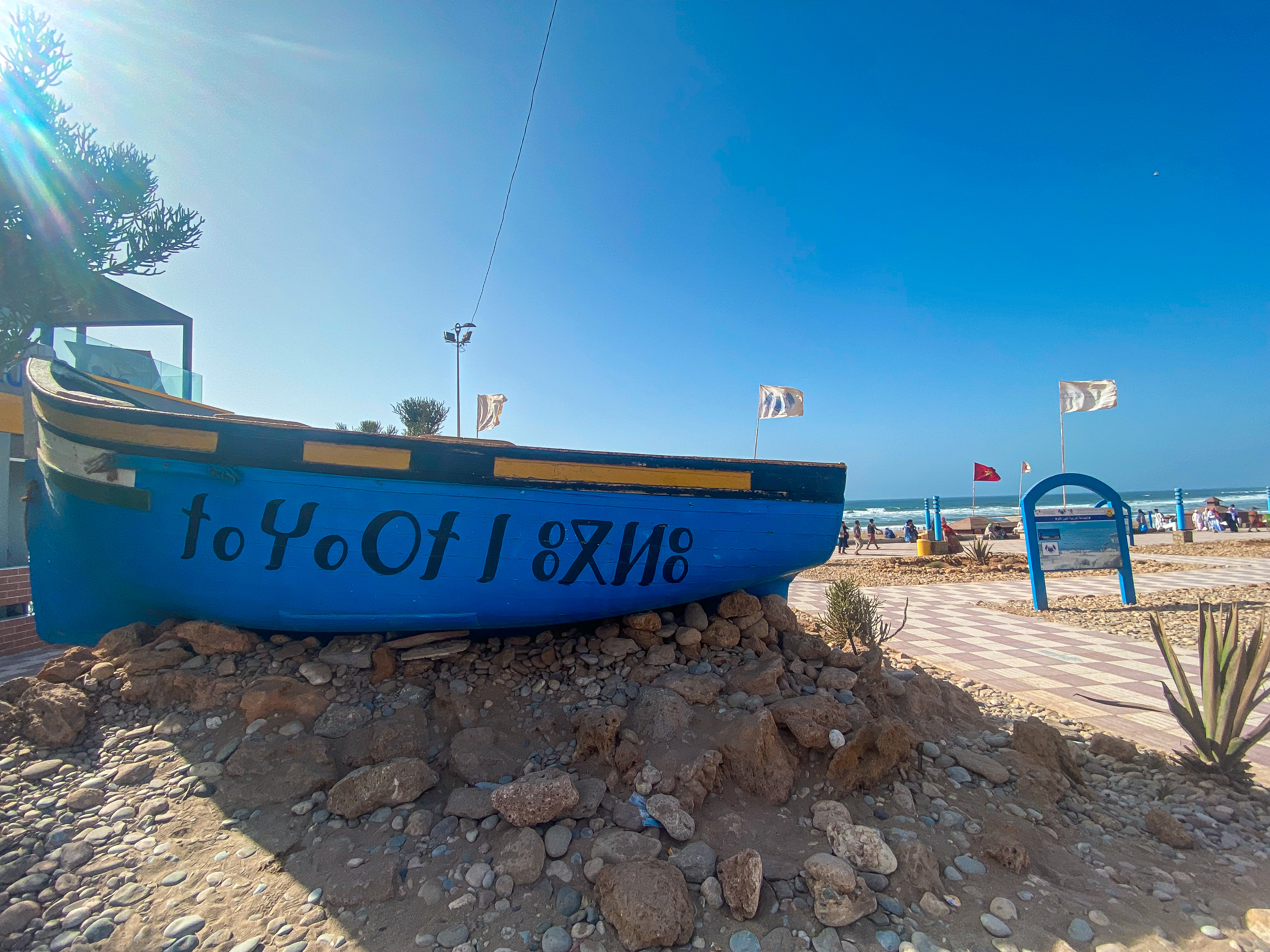
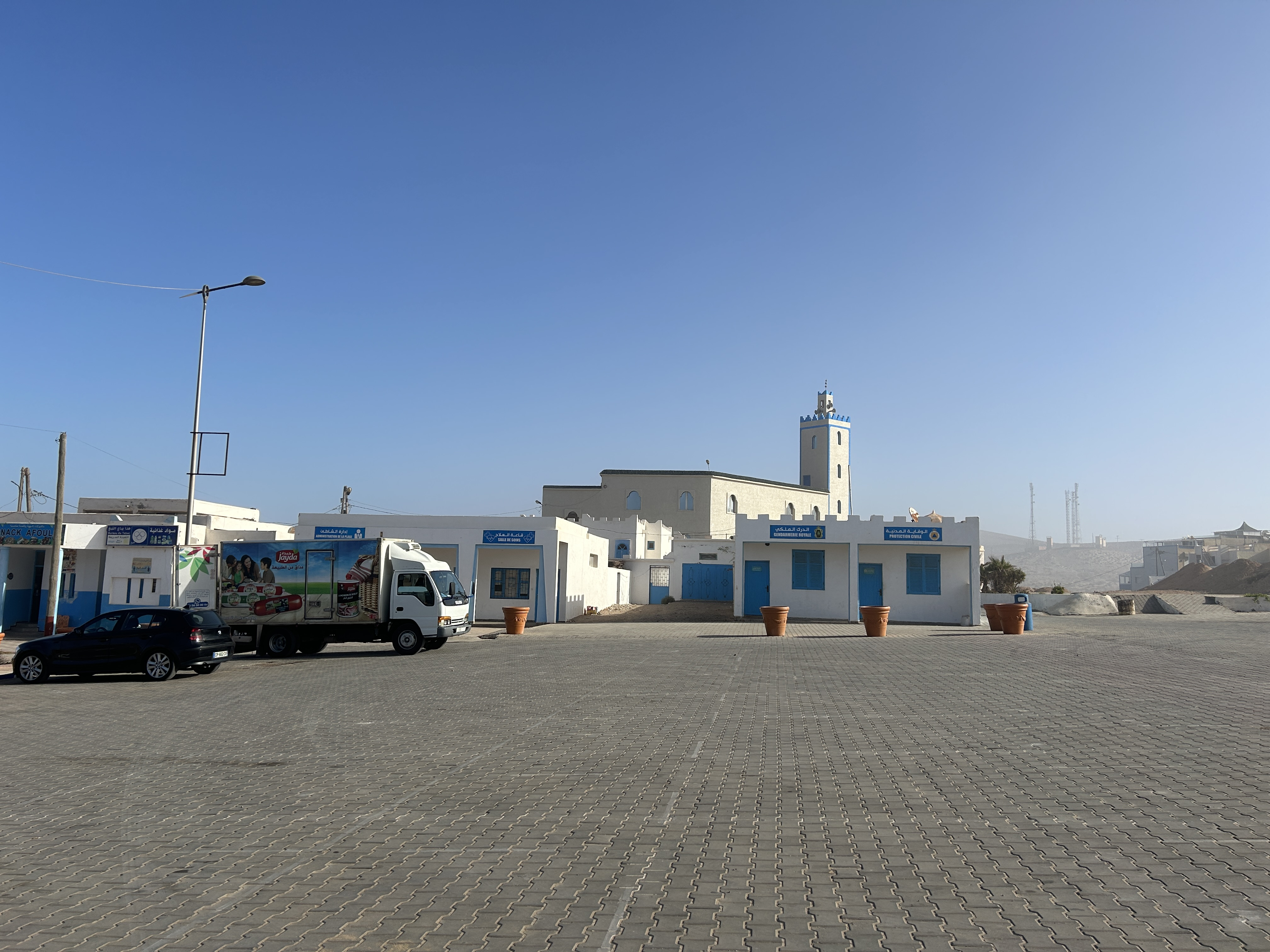
- Interactive map of Tnine Aglou
- Coordinates: 29.788888°N 9.81261°W
- Country: Morocco
- Region: Souss-Massa-Drâa
- Province: Tiznit Province

Population (2004)
  - Total: 14,632
- Time zone: UTC+0 (GMT)

Tnine Aglou is a small town and rural commune in Tiznit Province of the Souss-Massa-Drâa region of Morocco. At the time of the 2004 census, the commune had a total population of 14,632 people living in 3,128 households.

The town is home to "Ribat al-Murabitin", one of Morocco's oldest ribats where the founder of the Almoravid dynasty, Abdallah ibn Yasin, studied under Waggag ibn Zallu al-Lamti, who was buried there.
