= Tamima bint Yusuf =

Almoravid princess

Tamima bint Yusuf ibn Tashfin (Arabic: تميمة بنت يوسف بن تاشفين) was an Almoravid princess, she was a woman of letters and a political leader, who contributed to the development of the Almoravid movement. She was the daughter of Yusuf ibn Tashfin (r.1060-1106) and his wife Zaynab an-Nafzawiyyah, and the full-blooded sister of her father's successor Ali ibn Yusuf (r.1106-1142).

== Life ==
Tamima was known by the nickname Oum Talha (Talha's mother). She lived in Fez, and according to some sources she resided in Andalusia at some point in her life. Tamima received a literary education and could recite poetry. She managed her finances herself and closely watched her employees and accountants, discussing her affairs with them to the smallest detail. One of her secretaries happened to have fallen in love with her and confessed his love to her. Tamima responded to him with a line of poetry reminding him of the class difference that separates them.
