= Zaynab an-Nafzawiyyah =

Berber princess and politician

زينب النفزاوية ⵣⵉⵏⴱ ⵜⴰⵏⴼⵣⴰⵡⵜ Zaynab an-Nafzawiyyah
- Died: c. 1072
- Spouse: Luqūt al-Maghrāwi (m. ??; died 1058); Abu-Bakr Ibn-Umar (m. 1068; div. 1071); Yusuf ibn Tashfin (m. 1071)
- Issue: Ali ibn Yusuf; Tamima bint Yusuf
- Father: Ibrāhīm an-Nafzāwi
- Religion: Sunni Islam

Zaynab an-Nafzāwiyyah (Arabic: زينب النفزاوية, Berber languages: ⵣⵉⵏⴱ ⵜⴰⵏⴼⵣⴰⵡⵜ; died c. 1072), was a Berber woman of influence in the early days of the Almoravid Berber empire which gained control of parts of present-day Morocco, western-Algeria, modern-day Mauritania and Al-Andalus.

She was married to Yusuf ibn Tashfin (r. 1061–1107) and reportedly his de facto co-ruler. She was one of the wives of Berber kings given the title of malika (queen), which was not a given thing for the wives of Muslim monarchs, and called al-qa'ima bi mulkihi ('literally: the one in charge of her husband's mulk'), referring to her participation in the state affairs during the reign of her spouse. Though the khutba was never issued in her name, she was recognized to share the power of her spouse.

== Life ==
The earliest reference to her is in the anonymous 12th-century text Kitab al-Istibsar, where it says "In her time there was none more beautiful or intelligent or witty ... she was married to Yusuf, who built Marrakesh for her". This work names her father as Ibrāhīm an-Nafzāwi, a merchant originally from Kairouan.

According to Ibn Khaldun, she first became the concubine of Yusuf ibn Ali, chief of the Wurika and Aylana Berber tribes about Aghmat in Morocco. She then married Luqūt al-Maghrāwi, Emir of Aghmat. In 1058, Luqūt was killed in Tadla in a battle against the invading Almoravids and his wealth was inherited by Zaynab, his widow.

The most detailed information appears to be in the incomplete early 14th-century text Al-bayan al-mughrib. She is said to have had many offers of marriage from tribal chiefs from all over Morocco, but always declined by saying she would marry no-one who did not wish to become ruler of the whole country. It is said she had supernatural powers, and conversed with genies.

She married the Almoravid Emir, Abu-Bakr Ibn-Umar in September 1068 and offered to put her immense wealth at his disposal. It is said she blindfolded Abu Bakr, then led him to a secret cavern. When she removed the blindfold, he saw around him an immense treasure of gold and silver, pearls and rubies. "All this is yours" she said before leading him out - again blindfolded.

Abu Bakr began the construction of Marrakesh in May 1070. Work had not progressed very far when a messenger arrived pleading for his help in suppressing a revolt against the Almoravids deep in the Sahara Desert. Abu Bakr knew that his wife was not suited to the rigor of a desert life, therefore as was common among the Sanhaja tribes before extended military campaigns, Abu Bakr divorced Zaynab before he left, advising her to marry Yusuf if she needed protection. Yusuf ibn Tashfin, was left as Abu-Bakr Ibn-Umar's deputy in the Almoravid northern territories. Abu Bakr departed for the Sahara in January 1071, and after the Iddah legal period of 3 months' separation had ended, Zaynab duly married Yusuf in May of that year. It says that Yusuf owed the conquest of the Maghreb (Morocco, Algeria and Spain) to her advice, and that she was so expert in conducting negotiations that she was nicknamed "The Magician".

In 1072, Abu Bakr signaled his intention to return from the Sahara to take up his former position. Yusuf was understandably reluctant to yield, but did not know how to keep his position without triggering an internecine war with Abu Bakr. It is said that Zaynab, knowing of Abu Bakr's fondness for the desert life and his own reluctance to cause unwarranted bloodshed, advised Yusuf to confront Abu Bakr in a firm but courteous manner, and mollify him with luxurious presents. This Yusuf did, and the meeting passed without incident. Abu Bakr returned to the Sahara, but in a continuing homage to his former leader, Yusuf kept Abu-Bakr's name on the Almoravid coinage until his death some years later.

== Issue ==
Zaynab is known to have had at least the following children by Yusuf:

- Ali ibn Yusuf
- Tamima bint Yusuf
- Abu Abdallah Muhammad ibn Aisa

== Legacy ==
Her example and the fact that she assisted in creating the dynasty and its customs had great impact on the situation of women in Almoravid Morocco. In the tradition and example of her, women in Morocco had high status during the reign of the Almoravid dynasty; princesses were allowed to participate in state affairs; the education of women was accepted and normal (as it was throughout most of the pre-modern Muslim realms), with notable women such as Hafsa Bint al-Hajj al-Rukuniyya holding courses for the women of the palace; at least two women known to have been doctors, and, finally, princess Fannu famously participated in the defense of the capital during the dynasty's downfall in 1147.

== See also ==
- Zaynab, la rose d'Aghmat
