= Yusuf ibn Tashfin =

Ruler of Almoravid Dynasty (r. 1061–1106)

يوسف بن تاشفين ⵢⵓⵙⴼ ⵓⵜⴰⵛⴼⵉⵏ Yusuf ibn Tashfin
- Amir Al-Muslimin
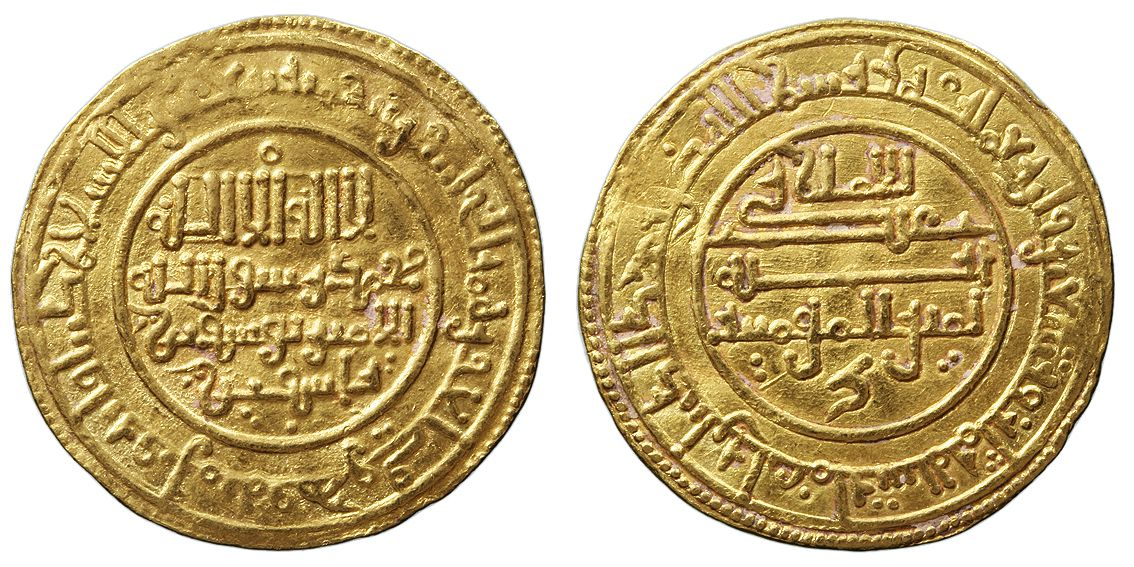
- Gold dinar issued under Yusuf ibn Tashfin

Amir of the Almoravids
- Reign: 1061–1106
- Predecessor: Abu Bakr ibn Umar
- Successor: Ali ibn Yusuf
- Born: 1009
- Died: c. 1106 (aged 96-97); Marrakesh
- Spouse: Zaynab an-Nafzawiyyah
- Issue: Abu Bakkar ibn Yusuf; Tamim ibn Yusuf; Ali ibn Yusuf; Sourah bint Yusuf; Tamima bint Yusuf
Names
- Yusuf ibn Tashfin
- Dynasty: Almoravid
- Father: Tashfin ibn Ibrahim Talagagin
- Mother: Fatima bint Syr
- Religion: Islam

Yusuf ibn Tashfin, also Tashafin, TeShufin, (Arabic: يوسف بن تاشفين ناصر الدين بن تالاكاكين الصنهاجي, romanized: Yūsuf ibn Tāshfīn Naṣr al-Dīn ibn Tālākakīn al-Ṣanhājī, Berber languages: ⵢⵓⵙⴼ ⵓⵜⴰⵛⴼⵉⵏ; reigned c. 1061 – 1106) was a Sanhaja leader of the Almoravid Empire. He co-founded the city of Marrakesh and led the Muslim forces in the Battle of Sagrajas.

In 1061 Yusuf ibn Tashfin took the title Amir al-Muslimin "Leader of the Muslims", recognizing the suzerainty of the Abbasid caliph as Amir al-Mu'minin "Leader of the Believers". He came to al-Andalus from the Maghreb upon the request of Andalusian Muslim taifas to fight against Alfonso VI of León, eventually achieving victory in Sagrajas. He eventually annexed the taifas and promoted an Islamic legal system in the region.

== Rise to power ==
Yusuf ibn Tashfin was a Berber of the Banu Turgut, a branch of the Lamtuna, a tribe belonging to the Sanhaja confederacy. The Sanhaja were linked by medieval Muslim genealogists with the Himyarite Kingdom through semi-mythical and mythical pre-Islamic kings, and some of the contemporary sources (e.g., ibn Arabi) add the nisba al-Himyari to Yusuf's name to indicate this legendary affiliation. For example, his surname is documented as Al-Sanhaji al-Himyari in the 14th-century work of Ismail ibn al-Ahmar. Modern scholarship rejects this Berber–Yemeni link as fanciful.

Abu Bakr ibn Umar, a leader of the Lamtuna and one of the original disciples of Abdallah ibn Yasin, who served as a spiritual liaison for followers of the Maliki school, was appointed chief commander after the death of his brother Yahya ibn Umar al-Lamtuni. His brother oversaw the military for ibn Yasin but was killed in the Battle of Tabfarilla against the Godala in 1056. Ibn Yasin, too, would die in battle against the Barghawata three years later.

Abu Bakr was an able general, taking the fertile Sous and its capital Aghmat a year after his brother's death, and would go on to suppress numerous revolts in the Sahara, on one such occasion entrusting his pious cousin Yusuf with the stewardship of Sous and thus the whole of his northern provinces. He appears to have handed him this authority in the interim but even went as far as to give Yusuf his wife, Zaynab an-Nafzawiyyah, purportedly the richest woman of Aghmat. This sort of trust and favor on the part of a seasoned veteran and savvy politician reflected the general esteem in which Yusuf was held, not to mention the power he attained as a military figure in his absence. Daunted by Yusuf's new-found power, Abu Bakr saw any attempts at recapturing his post as politically unfeasible and returned to the fringes of the Sahara to settle the unrest of the southern frontier.

== Expansion in Maghreb ==
Yusuf was an effective general and strategist who put together a formidable Army comprising Sudanese contingents, Christian mercenaries and the Saharan tribes of the Gudala, Lamtuna and Masufa, which enabled him to expand the empire, crossing the Atlas Mountains onto the plains of Morocco, reaching the Mediterranean Sea and capturing Fez in 1075, Tangier and Oujda in 1079, Tlemcen in 1080, and Ceuta in 1083, as well as Algiers, Ténès and Oran in 1082–83. He is regarded as the co-founder of the famous Moroccan city Marrakech (in Berber Murakush, corrupted to Morocco in English). The site had been chosen and work started by Abu Bakr in 1070. The work was completed by Yusuf, who then made it the capital of his empire, in place of the former capital Aghmāt.

== Conquest of al-Andalus ==
=== Taifa appeal ===
The Taifa period followed the demise of the Umayyad caliphate of Cordoba in 1030. One of the stronger taifa emirs was al-Mu'tamid, whose Abbadid-inherited taifa of Seville, ruled by him since 1069, was in jeopardy of being taken by the increasingly stronger king of León, Alfonso VI. Previously, the emir had launched a series of aggressive attacks on neighboring kingdoms, so as to amass more territory for himself, but his military aspirations and capabilities paled in comparison to those of the Leonese king, who in the name of Christendom, in 1085, captured the Taifa of Toledo and exacted parias, or tribute, from Muslim princes in places such as Granada, al-Mu'tamid of Seville being no exception. The tribute of the emirs bolstered the economy of the Christian kingdom and harmed the Muslim economy. These were the circumstances that led to the Almoravid conquest of al-Andalus. In a famous quote, rebuffing his son Rashid, who advised him not to call on Yusuf ibn Tashfin, al-Mu'tamid said:

I have no desire to be branded by my descendants as the man who delivered al-Andalus as prey to the infidels. I am loath to have my name cursed in every Muslim pulpit. And, for my part, I would rather be a camel-driver in Africa than a swineherd in Castile.

=== Battle of az-Zallaqah ===
By the time Abu Bakr died in 1087, after a skirmish in the Sahara as the result of a poison arrow, Yusuf had crossed over into al-Andalus and achieved victory at the Battle of az-Zallaqah, also known as the Battle of Sagrajas in the west. He came to al-Andalus with a force of 15,000 men, armed with javelins and daggers, most of his soldiers carrying two swords, shields, cuirass of the finest leather and animal hide, and accompanied by drummers for psychological effect. Yusuf's cavalry was said to have included 6,000 shock troops from Senegal mounted on white Arabian horses. Camels were also put to use. On October 23, 1086, the Almoravid forces, accompanied by 10,000 Andalusian fighters from local Muslim provinces, decisively checked the Reconquista, significantly outnumbering and defeating the largest Christian army ever assembled up to that point. The death of Yusuf's heir, however, prompted his speedy return to Africa.

=== Integration of Taifas ===
When Yusuf returned to al-Andalus in 1090, he tried to take Toledo without success. He saw the lax behavior of the taifa kings, both spiritually and militarily, as a breach of Islamic law and principles, and left Africa with the express purpose of usurping the power of all the Muslim principalities, under the auspices of the Abbasid caliph of Baghdad, with whom he had shared correspondence, and under the slogan:

The spreading of righteousness, the correction of injustice and the abolition of unlawful taxes.

The emirs in such cities as Seville, Badajoz, Almeria and Granada had grown accustomed to the extravagant ways of the west. On top of paying tribute to the Christians and giving Andalusian Jews unprecedented freedoms and authority, they had levied burdensome taxes on the populace to maintain this lifestyle. After a series of fatwas and careful deliberation, Yusuf saw the implementation of orthodoxy as long overdue. That year, he exiled the emirs 'Abdallah and his brother Tamim from Granada and Málaga, respectively, to Aghmāt, and a year later al-Mutamid of Seville suffered the same fate.

When all was said and done, Yusuf united all of the Muslim dominions of the Iberian Peninsula, with the exception of Zaragoza, to the Kingdom of Morocco, and situated his royal court at Marrakech. He took the title of Amir al-muslimin (Prince of the Muslims), seeing himself as humbly serving the Caliph of Baghdad, but to all intents and purposes he was considered the caliph of the western Islamic empire. The military might of the Almoravids was at its peak.

=== Military structure ===
The Sanhaja confederation, which consisted of a hierarchy of Lamtuna, Musaffa and Djudalla Berbers, represented the military's top brass. Amongst them were Andalusian Christians and heretic Africans, taking up duties as diwan al-gund, Yusuf's own personal bodyguard, including 2,000 black horsemen, whose tasks also included registering soldiers and making sure they were compensated financially. The occupying forces of the Almoravids were made up largely of horsemen, totaling no less than 20,000. Into the major cities of al-Andalus, Seville (7,000), Granada (1,000), Cordoba (1,000), 5,000 bordering Castile and 4,000 in western al-Andalus, succeeding waves of horsemen, in conjunction with the garrisons that had been left there after the Battle of Sagrajas, made responding, for the Taifa emirs, difficult. Soldiers on foot used bows and arrows, sabres, pikes, javelins, each protected by a cuirass of Moroccan leather and iron-spiked shields.

During the siege of the fort-town Aledo, in Murcia, previously captured by the Spaniard Garcia Giménez, Almoravid and Andalusian hosts are said to have used catapults, in addition to their customary drumbeat. Yusuf also established naval bases in Cadiz, Almeria and neighboring ports along the Mediterranean Sea. Ibn Maymun, the governor of Almeria, had a fleet at his disposal. Another such example is the Banu Ghaniya fleet stationed off the Balearic Islands that dominated the affairs of the western Mediterranean for much of the 12th century.

== Siege of Valencia ==
Although the Almoravids had not gained much in the way of territory from the Christians, rather than merely offsetting the Reconquista, Yusuf did succeed in capturing Valencia. A city divided between Muslims and Christians, under the weak rule of a petty emir paying tribute to the Christians, including the famous El Cid, Valencia proved to be an obstacle for the Almoravid military, despite their untouchable reputation. Abu Bakr ibn Ibrahim ibn Tashfin and Yusuf's nephew Abu 'Abdullah Muhammad both failed to defeat El Cid. Yusuf then sent Abu'l-Hasan 'Ali al-Hajj, but he was not successful either.

In 1097, on his fourth trip to al-Andalus, Yusuf sought to personally dig down and fight the armies of Alfonso VI, making his way towards all but abandoned, yet historically important, Toledo. Such a concerted effort was meant to draw the Christian forces, including those laying siege to Valencia, into the center of Iberia. On August 15, 1097, the Almoravids delivered yet another blow to Alfonso's forces, the Battle of Consuegra in which El Cid's son Diego was killed.

Muhammad ibn 'A'isha, Yusuf's son, whom he had appointed governor of Murcia, succeeded in holding back the Cid's forces at Alcira; still not capturing the city, but satisfied with the results of his campaigns, Yusuf left for his court at Marrakesh, only to return two years later in a new effort to take the provinces of eastern al-Andalus. After El Cid died in the same year, 1099, his wife Jimena began ruling until the coming of another Almoravid campaign at the tail end of 1100, led by Yusuf's trusted lieutenant Mazdali ibn Tilankan. After a seven-month siege, Alfonso and Jimena, despairing of the prospects of staving off the Almoravids, set fire to the great mosque in anger and abandoned the city.

Yusuf had finally conquered Valencia achieving dominance over eastern al-Andalus. He receives mention in the oldest Spanish epic Poema del Cid, also known as El Cantar del Mio Cid.

== Description and character ==
He was described as:

A wise and shrewd man, neither too prompt in his determinations, nor too slow in carrying them into effect

Yusuf was very much adapted to the rugged terrain of the Sahara and had no interests in the pomp of the Andalusian courts. He spoke Arabic poorly.

According to medieval Arabic writers, Yusuf was of average build and stature. He is further described as having:

had a clear brown complexion and he had a thin beard. His voice was soft, his speech elegant. His eyes were black, his nose was hooked, and he had fat on the fleshy portions of his ears. His hair was curly and his eyebrows met above his nose.

== Legacy ==
He was married to Zaynab an-Nafzawiyyah, whom he reportedly trusted in political matters.

His son and successor, Ali ibn Yusuf, was viewed as just as devout a Muslim as his father. Ali ibn Yusuf in 1135 exercised good stewardship by attending to the University of Al-Karaouine and ordering the extension of the mosque from 18 to 21 aisles, expanding the structure to more than 3,000 square meters. Some accounts suggest that to carry out this work Ali ibn Yusuf hired two Andalusian architects, who also built the central aisle of the Great Mosque of Tlemcen, Algeria, in 1136.

Córdoba, in about 1119, served as the launch pad for Andalusian insurrection. Christians on the northern frontier gained momentum shortly after Yusuf bin Tashfin's death, and the Almohads, beginning about 1120, were to engulf the southern frontier. This ultimately led to the disintegration of Yusuf's hard-gained territories by the time of Ibrahim ibn Tashfin (1146) and Ishaq ibn Ali (1146–1147), the last of the Almoravid dynasty.

== In popular culture ==
- In the 1961 movie El Cid, Yusuf ibn Tashfin is portrayed, under the name "Ben Yussuf", by Herbert Lom.
- Yusuf appears in Age of Empires II: The Conquerors as one of the primary antagonists in the "El Cid" campaign. However, he is described as "never showing his face", covering it with a cloth every time.
- Yusuf ibn Tashfin appears as protagonist in Naseem Hijazi's Urdu Novel "Yusuf bin Tashfeen".
- Yusuf ibn Tashfin appears as Hero in the Drama Serial "Pukaar", presented by Pakistan's Pakistan Television Corporation in 1995. In this series, the main characters were Yousaf bin Tashfin (played by Asal Din Khan), Zainab (Yousaf's wife), Ali (Yousaf's son), Alfonso VI (played by Ayub Khosa), Mutamid bin Abi Abbad (played by Hissam Qazi (Late)), and a princess of Leon (played by Laila Wasti).
- Yusuf appears in El Cid: the Legend as the primary antagonist. In the film, he is a cruel, unforgiving and evil man, contrary to his alleged reputation as an honorable man.

== Sources ==
- Richard Fletcher, Moorish Spain, (University of California Press, 1992)
- Ibn Idhari, Al-bayan al-mughrib Part III, annotated Spanish translation by A. Huici Miranda, Valencia, 1963.
- N. Levtzion & J.F.P. Hopkins, Corpus of early Arabic sources for West African history, Cambridge University Press, 1981, ISBN 0-521-22422-5 (reprint: Markus Wiener, Princeton, 2000, ISBN 1-55876-241-8). Contains English translations of extracts from medieval works dealing with the Almoravids; the selections cover some (but not all) of the information above.
- E. A. Freeman, History and Conquests of the Saracens, (Oxford, 1856)
- Codera, Decadencia y desaparición de los Almorávides en España (1889)
- H. R. Idris, Regierung und Verwaltung des vorderen Orients in islamischer Zeit, (Brill Academic Publishers, 1997)

Regnal titles
Preceded by Abu-Bakr Ibn-Umar	Almoravid dynasty 1061–1106	Succeeded by Ali ibn Yusuf
