= Amar Godomat =

Archer in Serer oral tradition

Amar Godomat (né. Ama Kodu Juuf in Serer, also known as Xamakodu Fa Maak (meaning Hamacodou The Elder, in Serer), or Amar Gôdômat, Ama Kodu Joof in Gambian English, or Ama Codou Diouf in Senegalese French)) is the name given in oral tradition to an 11th-century Serer archer.

Serer oral tradition relays that, a Serer bowman named Amar Godomat killed the 11th century Almoravid leader Abu Bakr ibn Umar in battle, with his bow near lake Rzik (just north of the Senegal) (Godomat's name apparently originates with this death). The battle is reported to have taken place near Khoo Maak in Serer country, commonly known as Lake Cayor. One source discussing this oral tradition says that "almoravid Abu Bakar Ben Umar was killed by the arrow of serer warrior Amar Godomat, in the month of shaa'ban 480 (November 1087). This regicide potentially signals his exodus after taking the name "Amar god o maat", "Amar (which) killed (the) king"."

Mauritanian oral tradition claims Abu Bakr was killed in a clash with the "Gangara" (Soninke Wangara) of the Tagant Region of southern Mauritania, relating that he was struck down by an arrow from an old, blind Gangara chieftain in the pass of Khma (between the Tagant and Assab mountains, en route to Ghana).

Another source for Abu Bakr's death says "In the region of Tagant on his way to Djabal al-Dbahab, the Mountain of Gold, he was wounded, according to the chronicles, by a poisoned arrow, shot by an old black bowman who could not see unless his eye-lids were raised up to uncover his eyeballs. The black bowman asked his daughter to hold open his eyes so that he could aim his arrow. It struck the Amir in the knee. Abu Bakr turned his horse around and rode off..." dying when he arrived in Tagant.

== See also ==
- Serer people
- Serer Religion
- Serer medieval history
- Joof family
