= Yahya Ibn Ibrahim =

Almoravid leader

Yahya Ibn Ibrahim (Arabic: يحيى بن إبراهيم الجدالي) (c. 1048) was a leader of the Godala tribe in the Adrar plateau modern day Mauritania. Yahya Ibn Ibrahim's primary significance was in his involvement with Abdallah ibn Yasin, a Berber Muslim theologian with whom he founded the Almoravid movement. Yahya Ibn Ibrahim is the first Almoravid emir. His successor Yahya ibn Umar was his nephew.

== Background ==
Yahya Ibn Ibrahim was from the Godala tribe and is native of Adrar in Mauritania. The Godala were a Berber tribe of the Sanhaja tribal confederation. They lived in the Saharan desert closest to the coast, beyond the Lamtuna. These tribes rose to proclaim the truth, to repel injustice and to abolish all non-canonical taxes (magharim). They were Sunnis, strict adherents of the school of Malik ibn Anas.

Abdallah ibn Yasin began to call people to Jihad and made them proclaim the truth.

As described by Al-Bakri Yahya Ibn Ibrahim went on the Hajj to Mecca and during his return journey met a jurist (Abu Imran al-Fasi). Al-Fasi was interested in the religious doctrines and customs of Ibrahim's native country. Al-Fasi found Ibrahim "wholly ignorant, though avid to learn, full of good intentions and firm of faith"

From Al-Bakri:

What prevents you from studying the religious law properly, and from ordering good and prohibiting evil?" Yahya replied: "Only those teachers come to us who possess neither piety nor knowledge of the Sunna" Then he asked Abu 'Imran to send with him one of his disciples, a man of whose learning and piety he was sure, who would teach them, and uphold the precepts of the Shari'a.

Abu Imran could not find anyone among those he deemed fit. So he sent Ibrahim to find Waggag Ibn Zalwi of the Maluksus Ibrahim followed Abu Imran's advice and visited Zalwi. Zalwi recommended a man called Abdallah ibn Yasin.

== Fallout ==
Abdallah ibn Yasin remained among the Godala, but considered their conduct sinful. They turned hostile to him later on because they found him too strict in his religious teachings. They refused to abide by his legal opinions and counsel.

Ibn Yasin visited Waggag who took the following action:

Subsequently, Waggag reproached them on the account of what they had done to Abd Allah, and informed them that whoever disobeyed him would be regarded as severing himself from the Islamic community and that his blood might lawfully shed. He then ordered Abdallah ibn Yasin to return to them, which he did, and killed those who had rebelled against him. He thus massacred many people whom he regarded as having deserved death because of their crimes of immorality.

Preceded by none founders of the Almoravid movement	Almoravid (along with Abdallah ibn Yasin); 1048	Succeeded by Abdallah ibn Yasin and Yahya ibn Umar
