= Abdallah ibn Yasin =

Theologian and founder of Almoravid movement

Abdallah ibn Yasin عبد الله بن ياسين الجزولي التامنراتي
- Succeeded by: Sulaiman ibn Haddu

Personal life
- Born: Tamanart
- Died: 7 July 1059 Krifla (near Aïn El Aouda, present-day Morocco)
- Resting place: Mausoleum of Moulay Abdallah in Krifla
- Occupation: Religious leader Military leader

Religious life
- Religion: Islam
- Denomination: Sunni
- Jurisprudence: Maliki

Muslim leader
- Disciple of: Waggag ibn Zallu al-Lamti
- Influenced: Abu Bakr ibn Umar Yusuf ibn Tashfin

ʿAbd Allāh ibn Yāsīn (Arabic: عبد الله بن ياسين; born in Tamanart, died 7 July 1059 C.E. in "Krifla" near Aïn El Aouda, present-day Morocco) was an Islamic theologian, spiritual leader and the founder of the Almoravid movement.

== Early life, education and career ==
Abdallah ibn Yasin was from the tribe of the Jazulah (pronounced Guezula), a Sanhaja sub-tribe. His mother was Tin Izamarren of the Jazula or tribe that lived in the village of Tamanart where he was born, she was from Temamanaout, at the edge of the desert bordering Ghana. A theologian of the Maliki school, he was a disciple of Waggag ibn Zallu al-Lamti, a relative of his, and studied in his Ribat, "Dar al-Murabitin" which was located in the village of Aglu, near present-day Tiznit. In 1046 the Gudala chief Yahya Ibn Ibrahim, came to the Ribat asking for someone to promulgate Islamic religious teachings amongst the Berbers of the Adrar (present-day Mauritania) and Waggag ibn Zallu chose to send Abdallah ibn Yasin with him. The Sanhaja were at this stage only superficially Islamized and still clung to many pagan practices, and so ibn Yasin preached to them an orthodox Sunnism.

After a revolt of the Godala he was forced to withdraw with his followers. In alliance with Yahya ibn Umar, the leader of the Lamtuna tribe, he managed to quell the rebellion.

Ibn Yasin now formed the Almoravid alliance from the tribes of the Lamtuna, the Masufa and the Godala, with himself as spiritual leader and Yahya ibn Umar taking the military command. In 1054 the Maghrawa-ruled Sijilmasa was conquered. Ibn Yasin introduced his orthodox rule - amongst other things wine and music were forbidden, non-Islamic taxes were abolished and one fifth of the spoils of war were allocated to the religious experts. This rigorous application of Islam soon provoked a revolt in 1055.

== Death ==
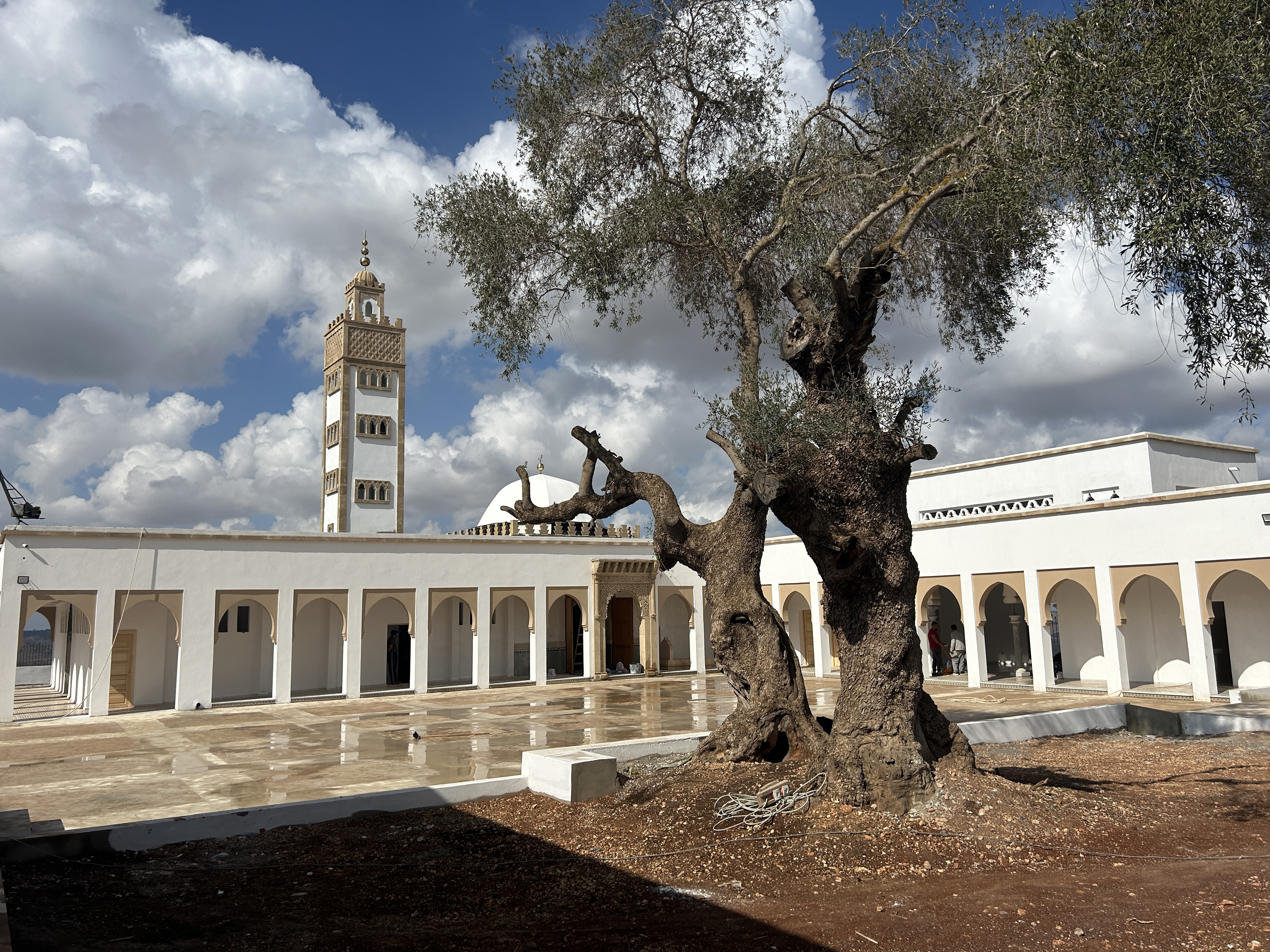
Mausoleum of Abdallah ibn Yasin, Krifla

Yahya ibn Umar was killed in 1056 in a renewed revolt of the Gudala in the Sahara, upon which Ibn Yasin appointed Yahya's brother Abu-Bakr Ibn-Umar (1056–1087) the new military leader. Abu Bakr destroyed Sijilmasa, but was not able to force the Gudala back into the Almoravid league. He went on to capture Sūs and its capital Aghmat (near modern Marrakesh) in 1058.

Ibn Yasin died while attempting to subjugate the Barghawata on the Atlantic coast in 1059. He was replaced by Sulaiman ibn Haddu, who, killed in turn, would not be replaced. His grave is south of Rabat, near Aïn El Aouda, overlooking the Krifla River, and is marked on Michelin maps as the marabout of Sidi Abdallah. A mosque and a mausoleum were built on his grave, and the site is still intact today.

== See also ==
- Almoravid dynasty
- Waggag ibn Zallu al-Lamti

Preceded by Creators of the almoravid movement	Almoravid (first with Yahya ibn Ibrahim then with Yahya ibn Umar at last with Abu Bakr ibn Umar); 1040–1059	Succeeded by Abu Bakr ibn Umar
