= Aoudaghost =

Aoudaghost Arabic: أودغست
- Site of medieval town
- Location in Mauritania
- Coordinates: 17°25′N 10°25′W
- Country: Mauritania

Trade routes of the Western Sahara c. 1000-1500. Goldfields are indicated by light brown shading: Bambuk, Bure, Lobi, and Akan.

Aoudaghost also transliterated as Awadaghust, Awdughast, Awdaghusht, Awdaghost, and Awdhaghurst (Arabic: أودغست) is a former Berber town in Hodh El Gharbi, Mauritania. It was an important oasis town at the southern end of a trans-Saharan caravan route that is mentioned in a number of early Arabic manuscripts. The archaeological ruins at Tegdaoust in southern Mauritania are thought to be the remains of the medieval town.

== History ==
The earliest mention of Aoudaghost is by al-Yaqubi in his Kitab al-Buldan completed in 889-890 in which he described the town as being controlled by a tribe of the Sanhaja and situated 50 stages south of Sijilmasa across the Sahara Desert. "It is the residence of their king who has no religion or law. He raids the land of the Sudan who have many kingdoms." In 962, the city conquered Awgham with an army of 100,000 camel cavalry. Over 20 kings of the Sudan paid Awdaghost tribute.

From Ibn Hawqal writing in around 977 we learn that the distance from Aoudaghost to Ghana (presumably the capital of the Empire) was 10 days' journey for a lightly loaded caravan. He wrote that the "king of Awdaghurst maintains relations with the ruler of Ghana", which suggests that at that time Aoudaghost was not part of the Ghana Empire. He also mentions the trade in gold and writes that the king of Ghana is very rich because of his stocks of gold but that the kings of Ghana and Kugha "stand in pressing need of [the goodwill of] the king of Awdaghust because of the salt which comes to them from the lands of Islam."

At some point in the late 10th or early 11th century the town became part of the Ghana Empire. Al-Bakri describes the 1054 capture of the town by the Almoravids:

In the year 1054-5 'Abd Allah b. Yasin invaded the town of Awdaghust, a flourishing locality, and a large town containing markets, numerous palms and henna trees. ... This town used to be the residence of the King of the Sudan who was called Ghana before the Arabs entered (the city of) Ghana... This (former) city was inhabited by Zenata together with Arabs who were always at loggerheads with each other. ... The Almoravids violated its women and declared everything that they took there to be booty of the community. ... The Almoravids persecuted the people of Awdaghust only because they recognized the authority of the ruler of Ghana.

Al-Idrisi, writing in Sicily in 1154, suggests that by the middle of the 12th century Aoudaghost was in decline: "This is a small town in the desert, with little water. ... Its population is not numerous and there is no large trade. The inhabitants' own camels from which they derive their livelihoods." It may have never recovered from the Almoravid attack, but had also lost control of the salt trade leading from the coast to Ghana to Takrur. By the beginning of the 13th century the oasis town of Oualata situated 360 km (220 mi) to the east had replaced Aoudaghost as the southern terminus of the major trans-Saharan caravan routes.

== Description ==
The only detailed description that we have for the town at its height is given by al-Bakri in his Book of Routes and Realms which was completed in 1068. Al-Bakri made use of earlier sources and it is likely that his description of Aoudaghost comes from the writings of Muhammad ibn Yusuf al-Warraq (904-973) whose own account has not survived:

Then to Awdaghust which is a large town, populous and built on sandy ground, overlooked by a big mountain, completely barren and devoid of vegetation. ... there is one cathedral mosque and many smaller ones ... Around the town are gardens with date palms. Wheat is grown there by digging with hoes, and it is watered with buckets ... Excellent cucumbers grow there, and there are a few small fig trees and some vines, as well as plantations of henna which produce a large crop ... [there are] wells with sweet water. Cattle and sheep are so numerous... Honey ... is abundant, brought from the land of the Sudan. The people of Awdaghust enjoy extensive benefits and huge wealth. The market there is at all times full of people... Their transactions are in gold, and they have no silver. Most of the inhabitants ... are natives of Ifriqiya [Tunisia] ... but there are also a few people from other countries ... [They own] slaves so numerous that one person from among them might possess a thousand servants or more.

== Archaeology ==
The archaeological site of Tegdaoust forms an artificial mound or tell extending for 12 hectares. It lies south of the Hodh depression and 34 km (21 mi) northeast of the small town of Tamchakett.

Excavations were carried out between 1960 and 1976 by a team of French archaeologists. The earliest layers date from the 7-9th centuries with the first mud-brick structures in the late 9th to early 10th centuries. Some stone buildings were constructed in the 11th century. The town appears to have been partly abandoned at the end of the 12th century and was completely abandoned by the 15th, although there was some resettlement two centuries later.

== In fiction ==
Medieval Audoghast, at the height of the thriving metropolis's influence, is the setting of the story "Dinner in Audoghast" by science fiction writer Bruce Sterling. It describes a lavish dinner of wealthy men at a merchant's house who hear that a fortuneteller is in town and invite him in to tell the future. He reveals that the city and indeed all of West Africa will soon be raided and destroyed; their achievements and culture will fall into oblivion while the currently "squalid" Europe will rise. The diners, considering the predictions absurd, scorn and ridicule the seer in a reversal of fantasy and fact from which the story draws its power.

== World Heritage Status ==
The archaeological site was added to the UNESCO World Heritage Tentative List on June 14, 2001, in the Cultural category.
