= Lamtuna =

Nomadic Berber tribe

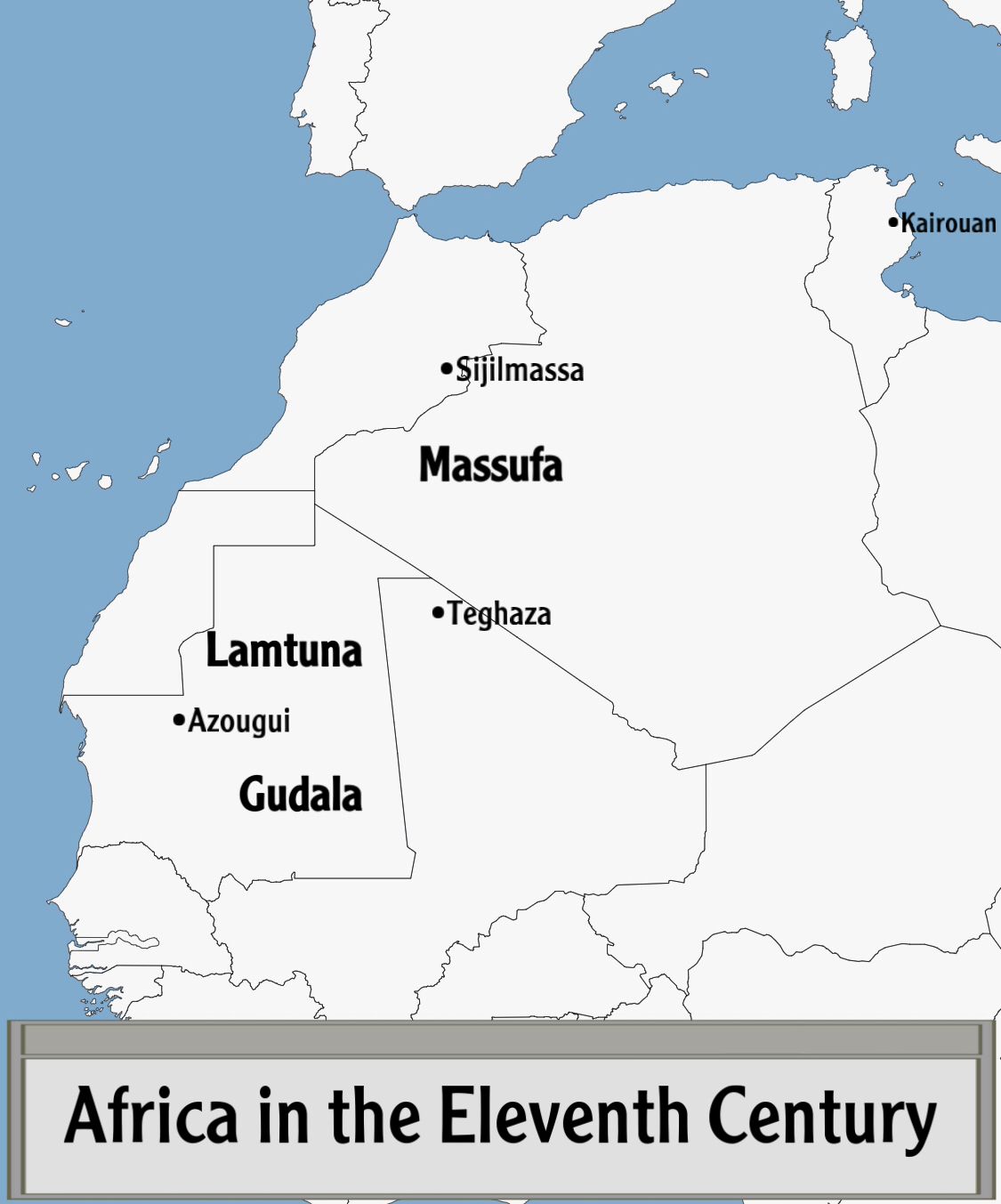
The location of the Lamtuna tribe in the 11th century

The Lamtuna (Berber languages: Ilemteyen) are a nomadic Berber tribe belonging to the Iẓnagen / Sanhaja (Zenaga) confederation, who traditionally inhabited areas from Sous to Adrar Plateau. During the Almoravid period, many Lamtunas emigrated northwards. Currently, the Lemtuna Tribe is based in the South of Mauritania (Monguel and Agueilat). The chief of this Tribe is Mr. Limam Ould Teguedi (former Minister of Justice, former Minister of Culture and former Attorney General of Mauritania). Among notable families are the family of Ehl Aly Ibn Ibrahim, the family of Ehel Sidelemine, Ehl Abdawa, Ehl Mohamed El-Emine and Ehl Mohammed Ghali. Sahrawi Tajakant as well as Messouma tribes are of the most recognisable offshoots of the Lamtunas. They inhabit areas in Algeria, Morocco, Mauritania and Western Sahara. The Banu Ghaniya, the successors of this dynasty in Tripoli and the Nafusa Mountains and the governors of the Spanish Balearic Islands until about the middle of the 13th century, originated from this tribe as well.

In antiquity, the Lamtuna were mentioned among five Numidian tribes that occupied the Touat region. Adjana, the ancestor of the Lamtuna, is said to have settled near the Chelif river. An ancient inscription discovered in Souk Ahras bears the name Lemlamitanus. In the 7th century the Lamtuna founded the city of Aoudaghost, which was also their capital. The city of Atar was also considered to be the capital of the Lamtuna tribe.

One of the members of the Sanhaja confederation, the Lamtuna inhabited the areas of Adrar and Tagant. During the 11th century, the Lamtuna, Godala, and Masufa tribes were united under the Lamtuna leader, Yahya ibn Ibrahim, of the Lamtuna tribe, expanding both his personal influence and that of the family. The Lamtuna sat at the top of the ruling class as well as holding positions in important administrative and military posts in the Almoravid dynasty. After Yahya Ibn Ibrahim's death Almoravid leadership was assumed by his brother, Abu Bakr ibn Umar, who was approved by the spiritual guide Abdullah Ibn Yacin, Abu Bakr Ibn Oumar fought against rebels in Mauritania in 1060. His cousin, Yusuf ibn Tashfin, continued to lead the Almoravids in southern Morocco and it was under his leadership that most of the Maghreb and Al-Andalus was conquered.

While the Lamtuna claim descent from the Himyarite Kingdom, with one of the chiefs sometimes referred to as Saharawi (one who comes from the Sahara). This name is seldom used in Arabic sources and doesn't appear to refer to a specific group. Genealogical data suggests that DNA may have been introduced by invaders from the Arabian Peninsula instead.

== Notable Lamtunas ==
- Abu Bakr ibn Umar
- Yusuf ibn Tashfin
- Yahya ibn Umar al-Lamtuni
