= Sijilmasa =

Historical Medieval city in Morocco

- سجلماسة (Arabic)
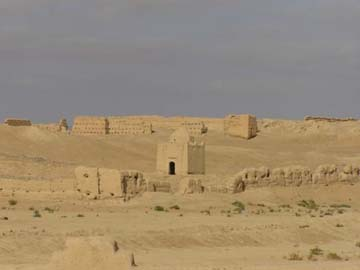
- Sijilmasa ruins
- Interactive map of Sijilmasa
- 31.28°N 4.28°W
- Type: Settlement
- Cultures: Berber, Arab
- Location: Rissani, Drâa-Tafilalet, Morocco
- Region: Errachidia

History
- Built: 757 A.D.
- Abandoned: 1393 A.D.

Site notes
- Excavation dates: 1988–1996
- Archaeologists: World Monuments Fund
- Owner: Moroccan Ministry of Culture

Sijilmasa (Arabic: سجلماسة; also transliterated Sijilmassa, Sidjilmasa, Sidjilmassa and Sigilmassa) was a medieval Moroccan city and trade entrepôt at the northern edge of the Sahara in Morocco. The ruins of the town extend for five miles along the River Ziz in the Tafilalt oasis near the town of Rissani. Its founding is associated with the creation of the Tafilalt oasis, and much of its economic success during the medieval period has been attributed to the agricultural capabilities granted by the oasis' massive canal. The town's history was marked by several successive invasions by Berber dynasties. Up until the 14th century, as the northern terminus for the western trans-Sahara trade route, it was one of the most important trade centres in the Maghreb during the Middle Ages.

== History ==
=== Foundation and early Middle Ages ===
According to al-Bakri's Book of Routes and Places, Sufrite Kharijites first settled the town in the wake of the Berber revolts against the Umayyads. Al-Bakri recounts that others joined these early settlers there, until they numbered around four thousand, at which point they laid the groundwork for the city. They elected a leader, 'Isa bin Mazid al-Aswad (the Black), to handle their affairs during the earliest first few years after the town's establishment. However, after ruling for 14 years, he was accused by his companions of corruption and executed. Abu al-Qasim Samgu bin Wasul al-Miknasi, chief of a branch of the Miknasa tribe, became the leader of the town. He and his descendants are known as the Midrar dynasty.

The Arab geographer Ibn Hawqal visited Spain and the Maghreb between 947 and 951 A.D. According to the account in his Kitab Surat al-Ard, completed around 988 AD, Sijilmasa grew in economic power due to shifting trade routes. At one time, trade between Egypt and the Ghana Empire took a direct route across the desert, but because of the harsh conditions, this route was abandoned. Instead caravans passed through the Maghreb to Sijilmasa, then headed south across the Sahara. Sijilmasa's economic wealth is evidenced by Ibn Hawqal's story about a bill issued to a trader in Awdaghust for 42,000 dinars from another merchant based out of Sijilmasa. Ibn Hawqal explains that he has never heard of such a large sum of money in all of his travels. Not only was Ibn Hawqal impressed with the volume of trade with the Maghrib and Egypt, Al-Masudi noted gold from Sudan was minted here.

On account of its wealth, the city was able to assert its independence under the Midrarid dynasty, freeing itself from the Abbasid Caliphate as early as 771. Shifting alliances with the Caliphate of Córdoba and the Fatimids of Ifriqiya destabilized the city during the 10th century, beginning with the visit to the city by Abd Allah al-Mahdi Billah, the man who was later known as the founder of the Fatimid dynasty. 'Abd Allah, accompanied by his son al-Qa'im, arrived in the Maghreb in 905. 'Abd Allah and his son made their way to Sijilmasa, fleeing persecution by the Abbasids, who not only belonged to the Isma'ili Shi'ite interpretations, but also threatened the status quo of Abbasid caliphate. According to legend, 'Abd Allah and his son fulfilled a prophecy that the mahdi would come from Mesopotamia to Sijilmasa. They hid among the population of Sijilmasa for four years under the countenance of the Midrar rulers, specifically one Prince Yasa'.

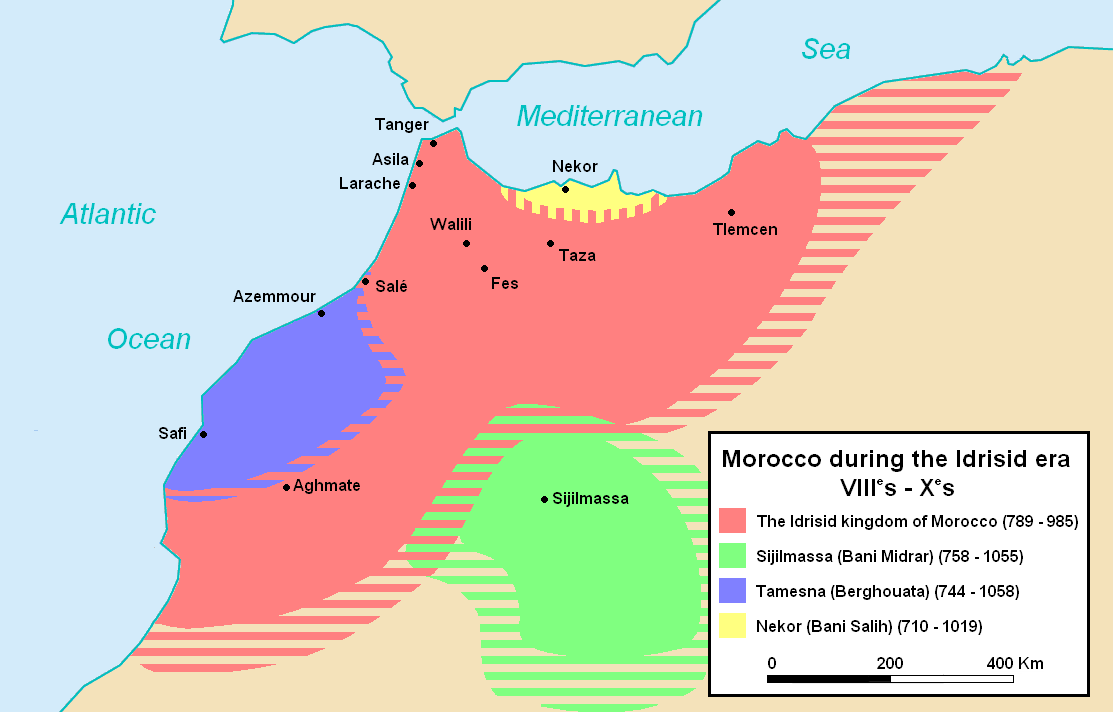
Map of Idrisid Morocco and its neighbors, showing Beni-Midrar's kingdom, the Kingdom of Sijilmasa

Al-Qasim, the son of 'Abd Allah, had miraculous powers and caused a spring to gush forth outside of the city. A Jewish resident of the city witnessed this, and spread the word throughout Sijilmasa that 'Abd Allah was going to attempt to take over the city. At or around the same time, Prince Yasa', the Midrarid ruler, received a letter from the Abbasids in Baghdad, warning him to close his frontiers and be wary of 'Abd Allah. Yasa' was forced to imprison the men he had previously patronized. 'Abd Allah's servant escaped to Kairouan, which at the time was a stronghold for Isma'ilis. The leader of the Isma'ilis in Ifriqiya was Abu 'Abdallah; he quickly mustered an army to rescue his compatriot. On his way to Sijilmasa, he subdued Tahert, the nearby Ibadi Kharijite stronghold under the Rustamid dynasty. The army arrived in the Tafilalt in the latter half of 909, and laid siege to the city. After Yasa' was killed in that year or the next, the Midrar dynasty began a long process of fragmentation that eventually resulted in a hostile takeover by the Maghrawa Berbers, former clients of the Cordoban caliphate.

=== Later Medieval Ages and Early Modernity ===
Under the Maghrawa, who later declared independence from the Cordoban caliphate, the city retained its role as a trade centre. It also became a center for the Maghrawan leadership and its campaign against other tribes in Morocco proper. After 60 years of Maghrawa rule, the elders of Sijilmasa appealed to the Sanhaja Berber confederation, which was just beginning its transformation into the Almoravid dynasty. According to al-Bakri, in 1055, Abdallah ibn Yasin, the spiritual leader of the Almoravid movement, responded by bringing his new army to Sijilmasa and killed the leader of the Maghrawa, Mas'ud ibn Wanudin al-Maghrawi. The Almoravid imposed an extremely strict interpretation of Islam, smashing music instruments and closing down wine shops throughout the city. While the city would rebel against the Almoravid garrison on more than one occasion, Sijilmasa became the Almoravid's first conquest. It was also the site of their first mint, which helped to solidify its role as a major economic center during this period. It retained its role as the Almoravids' only mint from 1058 to 1100. Sijilmasa remained under Almoravid control until 1146, when the Almohad Caliphate took control of the city. During the Almoravid's rule, the city shared in the centralized governing structure of the Almoravid Empire. Around this time the nearby mountain fortress of Jebel Mudawwar was established.

Trade routes of the western Sahara c. 1000–1500. Goldfields are indicated by light brown shading.

When the Almohads took the city in the mid-12th century, they also took advantage of the wealth of trade going through Sijilmasa. However, the strict philosophy imposed by the Almoravids at the beginning of their reign of Sijilmasa was overshadowed by the extremely violent practices of the Almohads. This culminated in the massacre of many of the Jews living in Sijilmasa.

Amid the fall of the Almohad dynasty to the Zenata Berber confederation under the Marinids, Sijilmasa once again played host to the latest Berber dynasty.

The Moroccan traveller Ibn Battuta stayed in Sijilmasa on his journey to visit the Mali Empire in 1352–1353. He wrote: "I reached the city of Sijilmasa, a very beautiful city. It has abundant dates of good quality. The city of al-Basra is like it in the abundance of dates, but those of Sijilmasa are superior." Ibn Battuta also mentions Sijilmasa when describing the Chinese town of Quanzhou: "In this city, as in all cities in China, men have orchards and fields and their houses in the middle, as they are in Siljimasa in our country. This is why their towns are so big."

Leo Africanus, who travelled to Morocco in the early 16th century, goes to the Tafilalt oasis and finds Sijilmasa destroyed. He remarks on the "most stately and high walls", which were apparently still standing. He continues to describe the city as "gallantly builte," writing there were many stately temples and colleges in the city and water wheels that drew water out of the river Ziz. Leo Africanus says that since the city was destroyed, former residents had moved into outlying villages and castles. He stayed in this area for seven months, saying that it was temperate and pleasant. According to Leo Africanus, the city was destroyed when its last prince was assassinated by the citizens of Sijilmasa, after which the populace spread across the countryside. Ibn Khaldun says in his Muqaddimah that the city fell due to a lack of resources. Lightfoot and Miller cite several facts from their findings on site: they say that oral tradition preserved by those in the Tafilalt says that the "Black Sultan", a malevolent dictator, was overthrown by the populace.

The city was rebuilt in the 18th century under the orders of Sultan Moulay Ismail. It was conquered and destroyed by the nomadic tribes of Ait Atta in 1818.

=== Modern period ===
Today, the ruins of Sijilmasa, located one km north of the town of Rissani, are recognized by the World Monuments Fund as an endangered site. In 1986, Moroccan archaeologist and director of INSAP Joudia Hassar-Benslimane published an article about the archaeology of Sijilmassa, highlighting its great importance. In 1988, the Moroccan-American Project of Sijilmassa (MAPS) was launched, and led to 6 excavations at the site, by a mixed team of Moroccan and American archaeologists. The ruins are now preserved by the Moroccan Ministry of Culture.

== See also ==
- Rissani
- Sigilmassasaurus

== Bibliography ==
- Gibb, H.A.R.; Beckingham, C.F., eds. (1994), The Travels of Ibn Baṭṭūṭa, A.D. 1325–1354 (Volume 4), London: Hakluyt Society, ISBN 978-0-904180-37-4. This volume was translated by Beckingham after Gibb's death in 1971.
- Hirschberg, H.Z. (1974), A History of the Jews in North Africa, New York: Brill Academic.
- Ibn Khaldun (1958), al-Muqaddimah, Franz Rosenthal, Princeton, NJ: Princeton University Press.
- Levtzion, Nehemia (1968), "Ibn-Hawqal, the cheque, and Awdaghost", Journal of African History, 9 (2): 223–233, doi:10.1017/S0021853700008847, JSTOR 179561, S2CID 162076182.
- Levtzion, Nehemia (1973), Ancient Ghana and Mali, London: Methuen, ISBN 0-8419-0431-6.
- Levtzion, Nehemia (1994), Islam in West Africa: Politics and Society to 1800, Grand Rapids, MI: Variorum, ISBN 0-86078-444-4.
- Levtzion, Nehemia; Hopkins, John F.P., eds. (2000), Corpus of Early Arabic Sources for West Africa, New York, NY: Marcus Weiner Press, ISBN 1-55876-241-8. First published in 1981.
- Lightfoot, Dale R.; Miller, James A. (1996), "Sijilmassa: The rise and fall of a walled oasis in medieval Morocco" (PDF), Annals of the Association of American Geographers, 86: 78–101, doi:10.1111/j.1467-8306.1996.tb01746.x.
