= Godala =

Medieval Berber tribe of coastal Mauritania

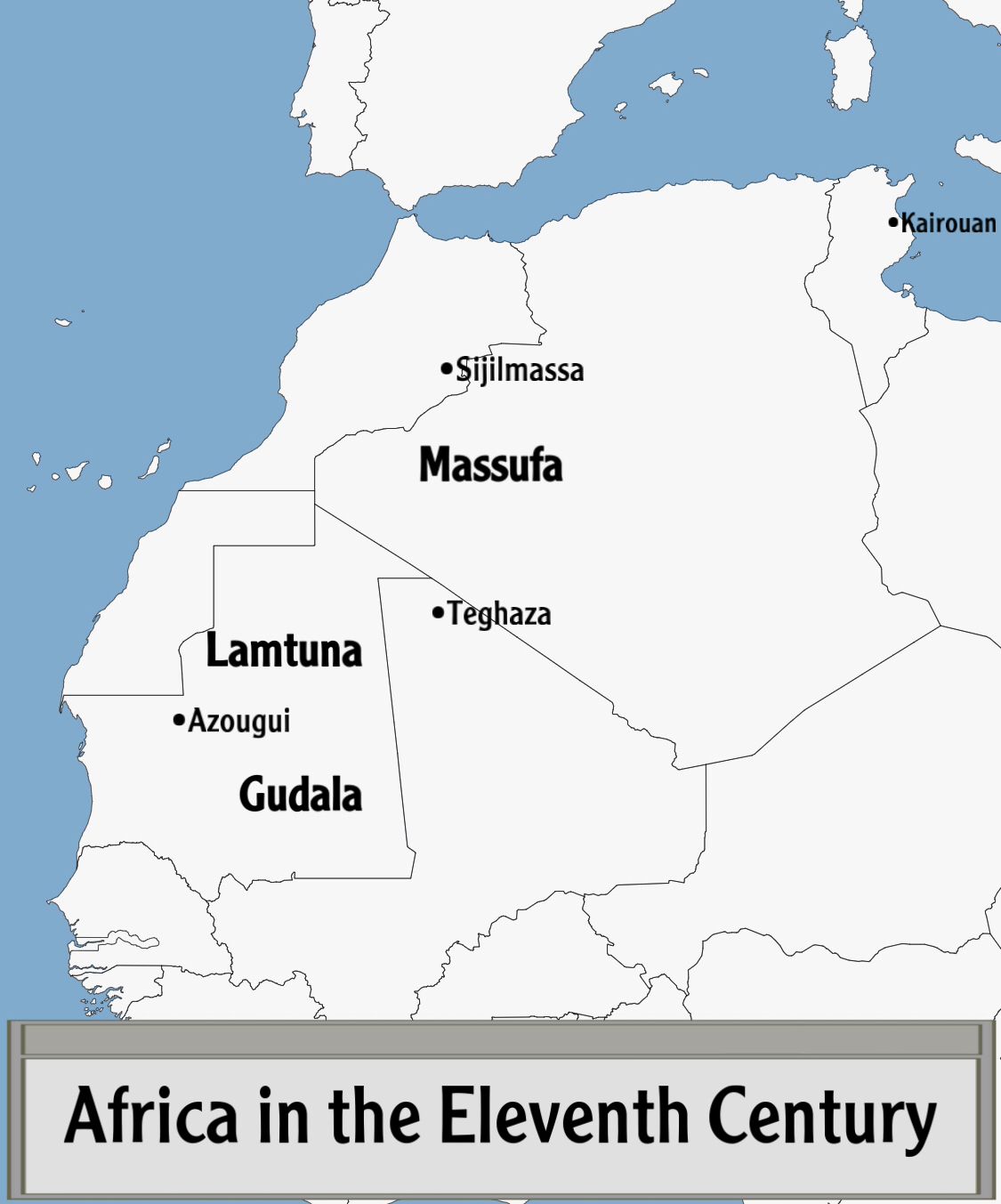
Sanhaja tribes, 11th century

The Godala or Gudāla is a Berber tribe in Western Africa that lived along the Atlantic coast in present-day Mauritania and participated in the Saharan salt trade and the salt mines of Ijiil. The Godala may be linked to or the same as the ancient Gaetuli tribe of Berbers.

According to a 1985 study of West African history, the area along both sides of the mouth of the Senegal River was controlled by the Godala group of Berbers. They mined the Awlil salt deposits along the coast just north of the mouth of the Senegal, and controlled a coastal trade route that linked southern Morocco. Godala territory bordered that of Takrur, and Godala caravans traded salt mined at Awlil along the north bank of the Senegal.

== History ==
Researchers believe that the Gudala are the remnants of the Gaetuli. The Gudala are attested in Mauretania Caesariensis in an ancient inscription in Cherchell. During the reign of Numidian king Jugurtha, the Gudala lived south of Numidia, they obeyed the leadership of Jugurtha and trained under him. It is believed that the Gudala revolted against Roman rule and fought against Juba II, the Gaetuli who revolted against Juba II occupied the southern slopes of the Aures mountains. In general, the Gudala settled in the Sahara since the ancient times and their branches were spread to the south across the right bank of the Senegal river, it is almost certain they were present there in the 7th century AD. The Gudala formed part of the Almoravid tribes.

== Guezula ==
The Godala are also known as the Guezula. Today, there are only two small fractions of the Godala left, each with only a few families who bear this name, one in Tiris and the other in Brakna Region.

== Sources ==
- General History of Africa: Africa from the twelfth to the sixteenth century edited by D. T. Niane, UNESCO, 1984 - 751 pages, (found on Google books) link
- UNESCO General History of Africa, Vol. IV, Abridged Edition: Africa from the Twelfth to the Sixteenth Century. By Joseph Ki-Zerbo, (found on Google books) University of California Press, May 10, 1998 - 277 pages, p62 link
- WESTERN AFRICA TO c1860 A.D. A PROVISIONAL HISTORICAL SCHEMA BASED ON CLIMATE PERIODS by George E. Brooks, Indiana University African Studies Program, Indiana University, Bloomington, Indiana, August, 1985
