= Sanhaja =

Major Berber tribal confederation

The Sanhaja (Arabic: صنهاجة, romanized: Ṣanhāja, or زناگة, Znāga; Berber languages: Aẓnag, pl. Iẓnagen, and Aẓnaj, pl. Iẓnajen) were a large Berber tribal confederation, along with the Zanata and Masmuda confederations. Many tribes in Algeria, Libya, Mali, Mauritania, Morocco, Niger, Senegal, Tunisia and Western Sahara bore and still carry this ethnonym, especially in its Berber form.

Other names include Zenaga, Znaga, Sanhája, Sanhâdja and Senhaja.

== Triad ==
Ibn Khaldun and others defined the Sanhaja as a grouping made up of three separate confederations, not as a single confederation. The distinction is usually made with a diacritical point placed above or below that is present in the Arabic text and often lost in English.

1. Danhāǧa/Sanhaja [Sanhaja of the first type] is a confederation of: Kutāma-Zawāwa of the Kabyle mountains, including some areas like Algiers and Constantine that no longer speak Taqbaylit dialects (they occupied all the northern part of the Constantinois region, between the Awrās/Aurès and the sea, that is the region containing the towns of Īkd̲j̲ān, Seṭīf, Bāg̲h̲āya, Ngaus/Niḳāwus, Tiguist/Tikist, Mīla, Constantine, Skīkda, D̲j̲id̲j̲ellī, Bellezma). This confederation includes the Massissenses of the Quinquegentiani, which we identify with the Msisna/Imsissen/Masinissa of the Massylii, on the right bank of the Soumam. The Zirid Dynasty, Hammadid Dynasty, Fatimid Caliphate, Taifa of Alpuente, Taifa of Granada, Kingdom of Ait Abbas and Kingdom of Kuku originate from this confederation.
2. Aznag/Iẓnagen (زناگة, Znaga) [Sanhaja of the second type ("Sanhaja of the veil" in reference to the blue face covering)] is a confederation of: Lemta, Massufa, Warith/Banū Warit, Lamtuna/Ilemteyen, Gudāla/Djudalla/Gazzula/Geuzula/Gaetuli, Anifa, Charta, Mandala. The Gezoula-Heskoura are defined as the brothers of the Aznag (from Teskee) as opposed to being part of the Aznag confederation. The Tebo/Tebou/Toubou speakers of Tebu are defined as Znaga according to Agnosti, Lemta by al-Yaqubi. This confederation is located primarily around the Western Sahara, Mauritania and Senegal. The Almoravids stem from the Lamtuna confederation.
3. Ṣanhāja [Sanhaja of the third type] is a confederation of: Maṣmūda-(G̲h̲umāra/Hintata/Barghawata). This confederation is located primarily in the area of the western High Atlas and the Moroccan Atlantic plains. The Almohads and Hafsid Dynasty stem from this confederation.

== Origins ==
Arab historians often attributed Himyarite origins to Berber tribes such as the Sanhaja and Kutama, who likely adopted those origins for political legitimacy. The historian al-Idrisi presented one example of the Himyarite myth:

He then traced the origin of the Ṣanhādja and Lamṭa tribes to their common male ancestor Lamṭ, son of Za'zā‘, who was from the children (min awlād) of Ḥimyar, and thus attributed to both of them the South Arabian roots. The similar origin is also ascribed to the "brother" of Ṣanhādj and Lamṭ by maternal line, Hawwār, whose forefather was al-Muṣawwir, son of al-Muthannā, son of Kalā‘, son of Ayman, son of Sa‘īd, son of Ḥimyar. According to a legend, his and his tribe's abode was in Hejaz, but they left it in search of lost camels, so that crossed the Nile and reached the Maghrib, where al-Muṣawwir married Tāzikāy, the mother of Ṣanhādj and Lamṭ.

== History ==
After the arrival of Islam, the Sanhaja spread to the borders of the Sudan region as far as the Senegal and Niger rivers.

The Sanhaja were a large part of the Berber population. From the 9th century, tribes were established in the Middle Atlas, the Rif Mountains and on the Atlantic coast of Morocco. Many of the Sanhaja, including the Kutama, settled in central and eastern Algeria (including Kabylia, Sétif, Algiers and M'sila) and northern Niger. The Kutama Fatimid Caliphate conquered all of North Africa and some of the Middle East. The Sanhaja Zirid and Hammadid dynasties controlled Ifriqiya until the 12th century, and ruled over all of the Maghreb.

In the mid-11th century, a group of Sanhaja chieftains returning from Hajj invited theologian ibn Yasin to preach among them. Ibn Yasin then united the Sanhaja and Gigidigoun tribes under the Almoravid dynasty, which established Morocco and conquered western Algeria and al-Andalus.

The Sanhaja remained either exploited semi-sedentary agriculturalists and fishermen, or religious (marabout or zawiya) tribes. Though often Arabized in culture and language, they descended from the population present before the arrival of the Arab Maqil tribes in the 12th century. They were subjugated by Arab-descended warrior castes in the 17th-century Char Bouba war.

== Present day ==
The descendants of the Sanhaja and their languages are still found in the Middle Atlas mountains, Sous, Western Sahara, northern (Senhaja de Srair...) and eastern Morocco, western Algeria, and Kabylia.

The Zenaga are a small population, believed to be of Gudala origin, that inhabit southwestern Mauritania and parts of northern Senegal.

== See also ==
- Masmuda
- Zenaga language
- Senhaja de Srair language
- Senhaja de Srair people
- Tekna
- Reguibat
