= Yahya ibn Ghaniya =

Almoravid military commander

Yahya ibn Ali ibn Ghaniya

Governor of Valencia
- In office 1133–1145
- Monarchs: Ali ibn Yusuf; Tashfin ibn Ali

Governor of Murcia
- In office 1133–1145
- Monarchs: Ali ibn Yusuf; Tashfin ibn Ali

Governor of al-Andalus
- In office 1146–1148
- Monarchs: Ibrahim ibn Tashfin; Ishaq ibn Ali

Personal details
- Died: 1148 Granada
- Parent: Ali ibn Yusuf

Military service
- Allegiance: Almoravid Empire
- Rank: Military commander

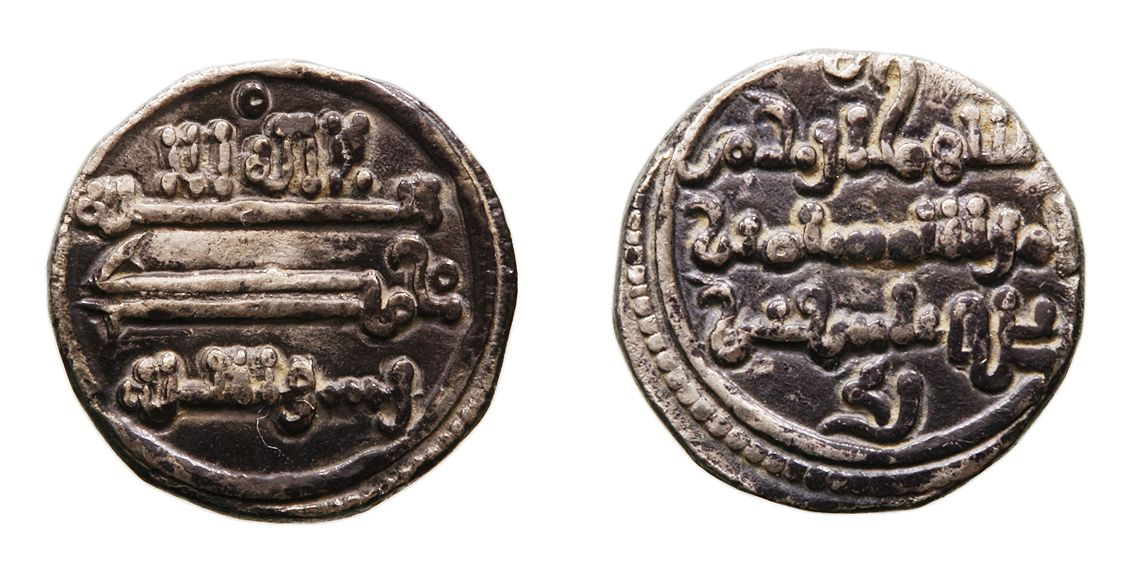

Yahya ibn Ali ibn Ghaniya (Arabic: يحيى بن علي بن غانية), more commonly known as Ibn Ghaniya, was governor of Valencia and Murcia (1133–1145) and of al-Andalus (1146–1148). He was the son of Ali ibn Yusuf, the head of a family allied with the Almoravid dynasty, and of an Almoravid princess named Ghaniya. His brother was Muhammad ibn Ali ibn Ganiya, the Almoravid wali (governor) of Mallorca. He is the first known person of the Banu Ghaniya.

== Biography ==
In 1133 he participated in the siege of Fraga, bringing troops from Valencia and breaking the siege. It seems that he had a single combat with the Aragonese king Alfonso the Battler, whom he mortally wounded. When the Taifa revolts against the Almoravids broke out, Yahya ibn Ali ibn Ghaniya commanded the Almoravid troops and faced the revolt but ended up fleeing to Almería. In 1146 he unsuccessfully defended Córdoba against Alfonso VII of León and Castile, of whom he eventually declared himself a vassal. After the Almohad landing on Cádiz in 1146, he was one of the last defenders of the Almoravids and he died in Granada in 1148.
