= Almohad conquest of Marrakesh (1147) =

Capture of Marrakesh (1147)
| Date | 1147 |
| Location | Marrakesh, Morocco |
| Result | Almohad victory |

Belligerents
| Almohad Caliphate | Almoravid dynasty |

Commanders and leaders
| Abd al-Mu'min | Ishaq ibn Ali † |

Strength
| 40,000 | 100,000 |

Casualties and losses
| Unknown | Heavy losses, 120,000 killed |

The Almohad Conquest of Marrakesh occurred in 1147 when the Almohad movement seized control of the Almoravid capital, Marrakesh. Almoravid Emir Ishaq ibn Ali's troops managed to maintain their hold on the city until Abd al-Mu'min led Almohad forces successfully penetrated the city's defenses after an extended siege. Before this event, the Almohads had already gained control over a significant portion of Almoravid territories in North Africa and al-Andalus.

== Background ==
The Almohad movement, initiated by Ibn Tumart, sought to overthrow the ruling Almoravid dynasty.

In 1130 the Almohads were defeated in an attempt to conquer Marrakesh from the Almoravids in the Battle of al-Buhayra. Ibn Tumart died in this battle and was succeeded by Abd al-Mu’min, who was to capture Marrakesh in 1147.

== Campaign ==
Abd al-Mu’min left Sūs in 1141 and began a long campaign working his way around the mountains conquering the High Atlas, Middle Atlas, and the Rif. He reached his native land of Tlemcen in 1142/1143 where he recruited members of his tribe, the Kumiya, and other associated groups who were then incorporated into the Almohad army. The next year in 1144 he defeated an Almoravid army allied with a Christian Militia. In 1145 he defeated the Almoravids, captured Oran and Tetouan, and killed the Almoravid king Tashfin ibn Ali. He later conquered Fez after a nine-month siege.

=== Capture of Marrakesh ===
In 1146-1147 Abd al-Mu’min completed the conquest of Morocco when he conquered Marrakesh after an eleven-month siege. Abd al-Mu’min executed the last Almoravid ruler and proceeded to massacre the Lamtuna Berbers. He made Marrakesh the capital of the Almohads. A Jew from Sijilmasa named Solomon reported that during Abd al-Mu’mins conquest of Fez 100,000 Muslims and Jews were killed and in Marrakesh 120,000, and although this is not to be taken literally, it corresponds with Arabic sources that mention how the male population was put to the sword while the female population was sold into slavery.

In the same year of the capture of Marrakesh, Abd al-Mu’min invaded Al-Andalus and between 1147/1148 gained possession of the southwestern quadrant of the Iberian peninsula.
