= Siege of Córdoba (1146) =

1146 capture of Córdoba by Alfonso VII of León

- Part of the Reconquista
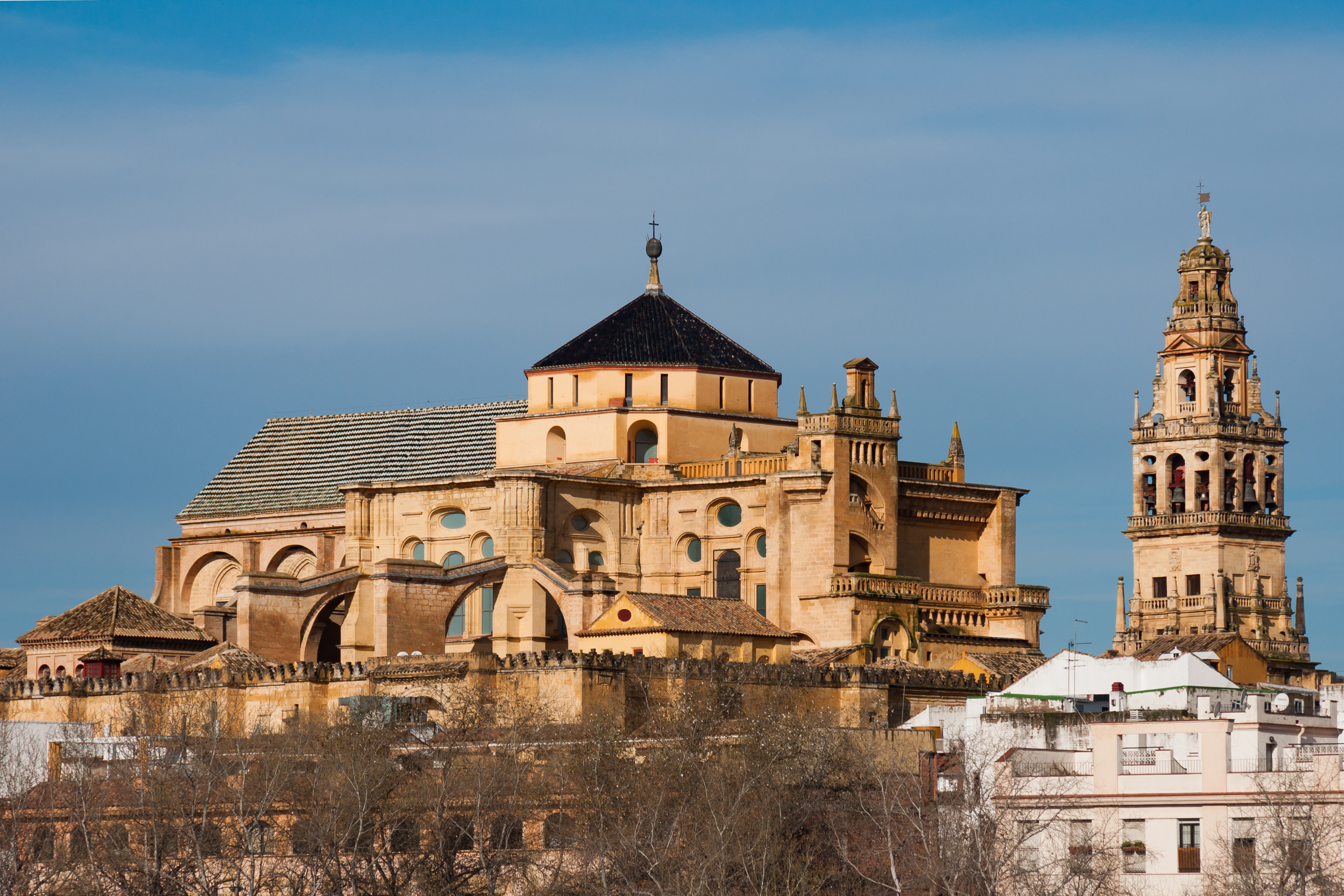
- The Great Mosque of Córdoba, Spain
Date	May 1146
Location	Córdoba, Almoravid Empire (Present-day Spain)
Result	Leonese victory

Belligerents
Kingdom of Leon	Almoravid Empire

Commanders and leaders
Alfonso VII of León; Ahmad ibn Hamdin	Yahya ibn Ghaniya

Strength
Unknown	Unknown

Casualties and losses
Unknown	Unknown

The Siege of Córdoba in May 1146 was led by Alfonso VII of León and Castile against the city of Córdoba, then held by the Almoravids. The siege was successful and Córdoba was conquered by the Christians, who forced Yahya ibn Ghaniya, the Almoravid governor of al-Andalus, to become a vassal of Alfonso.

== Background ==
Taking advantage of the fact that the Almoravids were fighting against the Almohads in North Africa, many Muslim territories of the Iberian Peninsula began to rebel and seek independence from the Almoravids, marking the beginning of the Second Taifas period. Rebellions were led in Gharb al-Andalus by Abu al-Qasim ibn Qasi and in Córdoba by Ahmad ibn Hamdin, while in Sharq al-Andalus a rebellion was headed by Sayf al-Dawla ibn Hud al-Mustansir, more commonly known as Zafadola, son of the last Hudid emir of Zaragoza (who entered the service of King Alfonso VII of Castile). Despite being ruled by Christians, Zafadola enjoyed prestige among the Andalusians, as he was the heir of the Banu Hud. When the revolution broke out, Yahya ibn Ghaniya commanded the Almoravid troops.

In February 1146, Ahmad ibn Hamdin, the ruler of Córdoba, was expelled from the city by ibn Ghaniya. Ibn Hamdin first fled to Badajoz and later to Andújar, where he was besieged by the Almoravid governor. Ibn Hamdin asked for help from Alfonso, who accepted his request and marched to al-Andalus in April or May of the same year. At Andújar, Alfonso forced ibn Ghaniya to lift the siege and freed ibn Hamdin. Although Alfonso had freed ibn Hamdin, he decided at that point to campaign to Córdoba and take control of the city.

== Siege ==
Ibn Ghaniya took refuge in Córdoba and in May 1146, Alfonso reached the city and started the siege. Alfonso managed to enter the city on May 24 but ibn Ghaniya and his army were taking refuge in the citadel and Alfonso had to initiate a siege on the fortress. Eventually, Alfonso came to terms with ibn Ghaniya, most likely because his army was not large enough to protect the city from an Almohad army that had recently landed in Cádiz. As a result, Alfonso lifted the siege in exchange for ibn Ghaniya's willingness to become a vassal. Despite the terms, ibn Ghaniya remained in the city for one week before departing.

During that time, Alfonso converted the mosque into a church and ordered a Christian cross be placed at the peak. Accompanied by the Bishop of Toledo, Afonso later attended a Mass at the new cathedral.

== Aftermath ==
Although ibn Ghaniya had declared himself a vassal of Alfonso, he returned his allegiance to the Almoravids shortly thereafter. The Almohads took Niebla, Mértola, Silves and the Algarve in what remained of 1146. The Almoravid Empire collapsed and fell into the hands of the Almohads in 1147, although they would still have to conquer other Taifas, including the Taifa of Murcia and the Taifa of Valencia which fell in 1172.
