= Almoravid dynasty =

1040–1147 Berber dynasty in west Africa and Iberia

Almoravid dynasty المرابطون (Arabic) Al-Murābiṭūn
- 1050s–1147
- The Almoravid empire at its greatest extent
- Status: Emirate: Nominal vassal of the Abbasid Caliphate (1104–1147)
- Capital: Azougui; Aghmat (1058–c. 1070); Marrakesh (c. 1070–1147)
- Official languages: Arabic
- Common languages: Berber languages, Arabic, Mozarabic
- Religion: Sunni Islam (official); School: Maliki; Minorities: Christianity (Mozarabic Rite), Judaism
- Demonym: Almoravid
- Government: Hereditary monarchy
- Emir
  - c. 1048: Yahya Ibn Ibrahim
  - 1146–1147: Ishaq ibn Ali
- History
  - Established: 1050s
  - Disestablished: 1147

Area
- 1120 est.: 1,000,000 km^{2} (390,000 sq mi)
- Currency: Almoravid dinar
Preceded by
Zenata kingdoms
First Taifas period
Barghawata Confederacy
Succeeded by
Almohad Caliphate
Second Taifas period

The Almoravid dynasty (Arabic: المرابطون, romanized: Al-Murābiṭūn, lit. 'those from the ribats') was a Berber Muslim dynasty centered in the territory of present-day Morocco. It established an empire that stretched over the western Maghreb and al-Andalus, starting in the 1050s and lasting until its fall to the Almohads in 1147.

The Almoravids emerged from a coalition of the Lamtuna, Gudala, and Massufa, nomadic Berber tribes living in what is now Mauritania and the Western Sahara, traversing the territory between the Draa, the Niger, and the Senegal rivers. Their movement was motivated by a reformist Islamic ideology, preached by their early religious leader Abdallah ibn Yasin, which sought to forcibly impose a rigorist and orthodox Maliki Sunni Islam on the world around them. During their expansion into the Maghreb, they founded the city of Marrakesh as a capital, c. 1070. Shortly after this, the empire was divided into two branches: a northern one centered in the Maghreb, led by Yusuf ibn Tashfin and his descendants, and a southern one based in the Sahara, led by Abu Bakr ibn Umar and his descendants.

The Almoravids expanded their control to al-Andalus (the Muslim territories in Iberia) and were crucial in temporarily halting the advance of the Christian kingdoms in this region, with the Battle of Sagrajas in 1086 among their signature victories. This united the Maghreb and al-Andalus politically for the first time and transformed the Almoravids into the first major Berber-led Islamic empire in the western Mediterranean. Their rulers never claimed the title of caliph and instead took on the title of Amir al-Muslimīn ("Prince of the Muslims") while formally acknowledging the overlordship of the Abbasid caliphs in Baghdad. The Almoravid period also contributed significantly to the Islamization of the Sahara region and to the urbanization of the western Maghreb, while cultural developments were spurred by increased contact between al-Andalus and Africa.

Almoravid power in al-Andalus began to decline after the loss of Zaragoza in 1118. The final cause of their downfall was the Masmuda-led Almohad rebellion initiated in the Maghreb by Ibn Tumart in the 1120s. The last Almoravid ruler, Ishaq ibn Ali, was killed when the Almohads captured Marrakesh in 1147 and established themselves as the new dominant power in both North Africa and Al-Andalus.

== Name ==
The term "Almoravid" comes from the Arabic "al-Murabit" (المرابط), through the Spanish: almorávide.

In Arabic, "al-Murabit" literally means "one who is tying" but figuratively means "one who is ready for battle at a fortress". The term is related to the notion of ribaṭ رِباط, a North African frontier monastery-fortress, through the root r-b-ṭ (ربط "rabaṭ": to tie, to unite or رابط "rābaṭa": to encamp).

The name "Almoravid" was tied to a school of Malikite law called "Dar al-Murabitin" founded in Sus al-Aksa, modern day Morocco, by a scholar named Waggag ibn Zallu. Ibn Zallu sent his student Abdallah ibn Yasin to preach Malikite Islam to the Sanhaja Berbers of the Adrar (present-day Mauritania). Hence, the name of the Almoravids comes from the followers of the Dar al-Murabitin, "the house of those who were bound together in the cause of God."

It is uncertain exactly when or why the Almoravids acquired that appellation. Al-Bakri, writing in 1068, before their apex, already calls them the al-Murabitun, but does not clarify the reasons for it. Writing three centuries later, Ibn Abi Zar suggested it was chosen early on by Abdallah ibn Yasin because, upon finding resistance among the Gudala Berbers of Adrar (Mauritania) to his teaching, he took a handful of followers to erect a makeshift ribat (monastery-fortress) on an offshore island (possibly Tidra island, in the Bay of Arguin). Ibn 'Idhari wrote that the name was suggested by Ibn Yasin in the "persevering in the fight" sense, to boost morale after a particularly hard-fought battle in the Draa valley c. 1054, in which they had taken many losses. Whichever explanation is true, it seems certain the appellation was chosen by the Almoravids for themselves, partly with the conscious goal of forestalling any tribal or ethnic identifications.

The name might be related to the ribat of Waggag ibn Zallu in the village of Aglu (near present-day Tiznit), where the future Almoravid spiritual leader Abdallah ibn Yasin got his initial training. The 13th-century Moroccan biographer Ibn al-Zayyat al-Tadili, and Qadi Ayyad before him in the 12th century, note that Waggag's learning center was called Dar al-Murabitin (The house of the Almoravids), and that might have inspired Ibn Yasin's choice of name for the movement.

== History ==
=== Origins ===
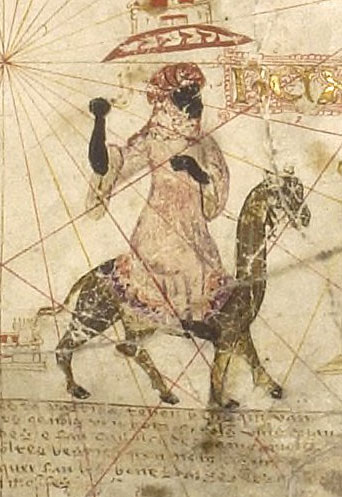
Possible depiction of Abu Bakr ibn Umar (labelled "Rex Bubecar"), in the 1413 portolan chart of Mecia de Viladestes

The Almoravids, sometimes called "al-mulathamun" ("the veiled ones", from litham, Arabic for "veil") trace their origins back to several Saharan Sanhaja nomadic tribes, dwelling in an area that stretches between the Senegal River in the south and the Draa River in the north. The first and main Almoravid founding tribe was the Lamtuna. It occupied the region around Awdaghust (Aoudaghost) in the southern Sahara according to contemporary Arab chroniclers such as al-Ya'qubi, al-Bakri and Ibn Hawqal. According to French historian Charles-André Julien: "The original cell of the Almoravid empire was a powerful Sanhaja tribe of the Sahara, the Lamtuna, whose place of origin was in the Adrar in Mauritania." The Tuareg people are believed to be their descendants.

These nomads had been converted to Islam in the 9th century. They were subsequently united in the 10th century and, with the zeal of new converts, launched several campaigns against the "Sudanese" (pagan peoples of sub-Saharan Africa). Under their king Tinbarutan ibn Usfayshar, the Sanhaja Lamtuna erected (or captured) the citadel of Awdaghust, a critical stop on the trans-Saharan trade route. After the collapse of the Sanhaja union, Awdaghust passed over to the Ghana Empire; and the trans-Saharan routes were taken over by the Zenata Maghrawa of Sijilmasa. The Maghrawa also exploited this disunion to dislodge the Sanhaja Gazzula and Lamta out of their pasturelands in the Sous and Draa valleys. Around 1035, the Lamtuna chieftain Abu Abdallah Muhammad ibn Tifat (alias Tarsina), tried to reunite the Sanhaja desert tribes, but his reign lasted less than three years.

Around 1040, Yahya ibn Ibrahim, a chieftain of the Gudala (and brother-in-law of the late Tarsina), went on pilgrimage to Mecca. On his return, he stopped by Kairouan in Ifriqiya, where he met Abu Imran al-Fasi, a native of Fez and a jurist and scholar of the Sunni Maliki school. At this time, Ifriqiya was in ferment. The Zirid ruler, al-Mu'izz ibn Badis, was openly contemplating breaking with his Shi'ite Fatimid overlords in Cairo, and the jurists of Kairouan were agitating for him to do so. Within this heady atmosphere, Yahya and Abu Imran fell into conversation on the state of the faith in their western homelands, and Yahya expressed his disappointment at the lack of religious education and negligence of Islamic law among his southern Sanhaja people. With Abu Imran's recommendation, Yahya ibn Ibrahim made his way to the ribat of Waggag ibn Zelu in the Sous valley of southern Morocco, to seek out a Maliki teacher for his people. Waggag assigned him one of his residents, Abdallah ibn Yasin.

Abdallah ibn Yasin was a Gazzula Berber, and probably a convert rather than a born Muslim. His name can be read as "son of Ya-Sin" (the title of the 36th surah of the Qur'an), suggesting he had obliterated his family past and was "re-born" of the Holy Book. Ibn Yasin certainly had the ardor of a puritan zealot; his creed was mainly characterized by a rigid formalism and a strict adherence to the dictates of the Quran, and the Orthodox tradition. (Chroniclers such as al-Bakri allege Ibn Yasin's learning was superficial.) Ibn Yasin's initial meetings with the Gudala people went poorly. As he had more ardor than depth, Ibn Yasin's arguments were disputed by his audience. He responded to questioning with charges of apostasy and handed out harsh punishments for the slightest deviations. The Guddala soon had enough and expelled him almost immediately after the death of his protector, Yahya ibn Ibrahim, sometime in the 1040s.

Ibn Yasin, however, found a more favorable reception among the neighboring Lamtuna people. Probably sensing the useful organizing power of Ibn Yasin's pious fervor, the Lamtuna chieftain Yahya ibn Umar al-Lamtuni invited the man to preach to his people. The Lamtuna leaders, however, kept Ibn Yasin on a careful leash, forging a more productive partnership between them. Invoking stories of the early life of Muhammad, Ibn Yasin preached that conquest was a necessary addendum to Islamicization, that it was not enough to merely adhere to God's law, but necessary to also destroy opposition to it. In Ibn Yasin's ideology, anything and everything outside of Islamic law could be characterized as "opposition". He identified tribalism, in particular, as an obstacle. He believed it was not enough to urge his audiences to put aside their blood loyalties and ethnic differences, and embrace the equality of all Muslims under the Sacred Law, it was necessary to make them do so. For the Lamtuna leadership, this new ideology dovetailed with their long desire to refound the Sanhaja union and recover their lost dominions. In the early 1050s, the Lamtuna, under the joint leadership of Yahya ibn Umar and Abdallah ibn Yasin—soon calling themselves the al-Murabitin (Almoravids)—set out on a campaign to bring their neighbors over to their cause.

=== Early conquests ===
In the early 1050s, a kind of triumvirate emerged in leading the Almoravid movement, including Abdallah Ibn Yasin, Yahya Ibn Umar and his brother Abu Bakr Ibn Umar. The movement was now dominated by the Lamtuna rather than the Guddala. During the 1050s, the Almoravids began their expansion and their conquest of the Saharan tribes. Their first major targets were two strategic cities located at the northern and southern edges of the desert: Sijilmasa in the north and Awdaghust in the south. Control of these two cities would allow the Almoravids to effectively control the trans-Saharan trade routes. Sijilmasa was controlled by the Maghrawa, a part of the northern Zenata Berber confederation, while Awdaghust was controlled by the Soninke. Both cities were captured in 1054 or 1055. Sijilmasa was captured first and its leader, Mas'ud Ibn Wannudin, was killed, along with other Maghrawa leaders. According to historical sources, the Almoravid army rode on camels and numbered 30,000, though this number may be an exaggeration. Strengthened with the spoils of their victory, they left a garrison of Lamtuna tribesmen in the city and then turned south to capture Awdaghust, which they accomplished that same year. Although the town was mainly Muslim, the Almoravids pillaged the city and treated the population harshly on the basis that they recognized the pagan king of Ghana.

Not long after the main Almoravid army left Sijilmasa, the city rebelled and the Maghrawa returned, slaughtering the Lamtuna garrison. Ibn Yasin responded by organizing a second expedition to recapture it, but the Guddala refused to join him and returned instead to their homelands in the desert regions along the Atlantic coast. Historian Amira Bennison suggests that some Almoravids, including the Guddala, were unwilling to be dragged into a conflict with the powerful Zanata tribes of the north and this created tension with those, like Ibn Yasin, who saw northern expansion as the next step in their fortunes. While Ibn Yasin went north, Yahya Ibn Umar remained in the south in the Adrar, the heartland of the Lamtuna, in a defensible and well-provisioned place called Jabal Lamtuna, about 10 kilometres northwest of modern Atar. His stronghold there was a fortress called Azuggi (also rendered variably as Azougui or Azukki), which had been built earlier by his brother Yannu ibn Umar al-Hajj. Some scholars, including Attilio Gaudio, Christiane Vanacker, and Brigitte Himpan and Diane Himpan-Sabatier describe Azuggi as the "first capital" of the Almoravids. Yahya ibn Umar was subsequently killed in battle against the Guddala in 1055 or 1056, or later in 1057.

Meanwhile, in the north, Ibn Yasin had ordered Abu Bakr to take command of the Almoravid army and they soon recaptured Sijilmasa. By 1056, they had conquered Taroudant and the Sous Valley, continuing to impose Maliki Islamic law over the communities they conquered. When the campaign concluded that year, they retired to Sijilmasa and established their base there. It was around this time that Abu Bakr appointed his cousin, Yusuf ibn Tashfin, to command the garrison of the city.

In 1058, they crossed the High Atlas and conquered Aghmat, a prosperous commercial town near the foothills of the mountains, and made it their capital. They then came into contact with the Barghawata, a Berber tribal confederation who followed an Islamic "heresy" preached by Salih ibn Tarif three centuries earlier. The Barghawata occupied the region northwest of Aghmat and along the Atlantic coast. They resisted the Almoravids fiercely and the campaign against them was bloody. Abdullah ibn Yasin was killed in battle with them in 1058 or 1059, at a place called Kurīfalalt or Kurifala. By 1060, however, they were conquered by Abu Bakr ibn Umar and were forced to convert to orthodox Islam. Shortly after this, Abu Bakr had reached as far as Meknes.

Towards 1068, Abu Bakr married a noble and wealthy Berber woman, Zaynab an-Nafzawiyyah, who would become very influential in the development of the dynasty. Zaynab was the daughter of a wealthy merchant from Kairouan who had settled in Aghmat. She had been previously married to Laqut ibn Yusuf ibn Ali al-Maghrawi, the ruler of Aghmat, until the latter was killed during the Almoravid conquest of the city.

=== Founding of Marrakesh and internal division ===
It was around this time that Abu Bakr ibn Umar founded the new capital of Marrakesh. Historical sources cite a variety of dates for this event ranging from 1062, given by Ibn Abi Zar and Ibn Khaldun, to 1078 (470 AH), given by Muhammad al-Idrisi. The year 1070, given by Ibn Idhari, is more commonly used by modern historians, although 1062 is still cited by some writers. Shortly after founding the new city, Abu Bakr was compelled to return south to the Sahara in order to suppress a rebellion by the Guddala and their allies which threatened the desert trade routes, in either 1060 or 1071. His wife Zaynab appears to have been unwilling to follow him south and he granted her a divorce. Apparently on Abu Bakr's instructions, she was then married to Yusuf Ibn Tashfin. Before leaving, Abu Bakr appointed Ibn Tashfin as his deputy in charge of the new Almoravid territories in the north. According to Ibn Idhari, Zaynab became his most important political advisor.

A year later, after suppressing the revolt in the south, Abu Bakr returned north toward Marrakesh, expecting to resume his control of the city and of the Almoravid forces in North Africa. Ibn Tashfin, however, was now unwilling to give up his own position of leadership. While Abu Bakr was still camped near Aghmat, Ibn Tashfin sent him lavish gifts but refused to obey his summons, reportedly on the advice of Zaynab. Abu Bakr recognized that he was unable to force the issue and was unwilling to fight a battle over control of Marrakesh, so he decided to voluntarily recognize Ibn Tashfin's leadership in the Maghreb. The two men met on neutral ground between Aghmat and Marrakesh to confirm the arrangement. After a short stay in Aghmat, Abu Bakr returned south to continue his leadership of the Almoravids in the Sahara.

Following this, the Almoravid Empire was divided into two distinct but co-dependent parts: one led by Ibn Tashfin in the north, and another led by Abu Bakr in the south. Abu Bakr continued to be formally acknowledged as the supreme leader of the Almoravids until his death in 1087. Historical sources give no indication that the two leaders treated each other as enemies and Ibn Tashfin continued to mint coins in Abu Bakr's name until the latter's death. Following Abu Bakr's departure, Ibn Tashfin was largely responsible for building the Almoravid state in the Maghreb over the next two decades. One of Abu Bakr's sons, Ibrahim, who served as the Almoravid leader in Sijilmasa between 1071 and 1076 (according to the coinage minted there), did develop a rivalry with Ibn Tashfin and attempted to confront him toward 1076. He marched to Aghmat with the intention of reclaiming his father's position in the Maghreb. Another Almoravid commander, Mazdali ibn Tilankan, who was related to both men, defused the situation and convinced Ibrahim to join his father in the south rather than start a civil war.

=== Further conquests in the Maghreb ===
Ibn Tashfin had in the meantime helped to bring the large area of what is now Morocco, Western Sahara, and Mauritania under Almoravid control. He spent at least several years capturing each fort and settlement in the region around Fez and in northern Morocco. After most of the surrounding region was under his control, he was finally able to conquer Fez definitively. However, there is some contradiction and uncertainty among historical sources regarding the exact chronology of these conquests, with some sources dating the main conquests to the 1060s and others dating them to the 1070s. Some modern authors cite the date of the final conquest of Fez as 1069 (461 AH). Historian Ronald Messier gives the date more specifically as 18 March 1070 (462 AH). Other historians date this conquest to 1074 or 1075.

In 1079, Ibn Tashfin sent an army 20,000 strong from Marrakesh to push towards what is now Tlemcen to attack the Banu Ya'la, the Zenata tribe occupying the area. Led by Mazdali Ibn Tilankan, the army defeated the Banu Ya'la in battle near the valley of the Moulaya River and executed their commander, Mali Ibn Ya'la, the son of Tlemcen's ruler. However, Ibn Tilankan did not push to Tlemcen right away as the city of Oujda, occupied by the Bani Iznasan, was too strong to capture. Instead, Ibn Tashfin himself returned with an army in 1081 that captured Oujda and then conquered Tlemcen, massacring the Maghrawa forces there and their leader, al-Abbas Ibn Bakhti al-Maghrawi. He pressed on and by 1082 he had captured Algiers. Ibn Tashfin subsequently treated Tlemcen as his eastern base. At that time, the city had consisted of an older settlement called Agadir, but Ibn Tashfin founded a new city next to it called Takrart, which later merged with Agadir in the Almohad period to become the present city.

The Almoravids subsequently clashed with the Hammadids to the east multiple times, but they did not make a sustained effort to conquer the central Maghrib and instead focused their efforts on other fronts. Eventually, in 1104, they signed a peace treaty with the Hammadids. Algiers became their easternmost outpost.

By the 1080s, local Muslim rulers in al-Andalus (the Iberian Peninsula) were requesting Ibn Tashfin's help against the encroaching Christian kingdoms to the north. Ibn Tashfin made the capture of Ceuta his primary objective before making any attempt to intervene there. Ceuta, controlled by Zenata forces under the command of Diya al-Dawla Yahya, was the last major city on the African side of the Strait of Gibraltar that still held out against him. In return for a promise to help him, Ibn Tashfin demanded that al-Mu'tamid ibn Abbad, the ruler of Seville, provide assistance in besieging the city. Al-Mu'tamid obliged and sent a fleet to blockade the city by sea, while Ibn Tashfin's son Tamim led the siege by land. The city finally surrendered in June–July 1083 or in August 1084.

Ibn Tashfin also made efforts to organize the new Almoravid realm. Under his rule, the western Maghreb was divided into well-defined administrative provinces for the first time—prior to this, it had been mostly tribal territory. A developing central government was established in Marrakesh, while he entrusted key provinces to important allies and relatives. The nascent Almoravid state was funded in part by the taxes allowed under Islamic law and by the gold that came from Ghana in the south, but in practice it remained dependent on the spoils of new conquests. The majority of the Almoravid army continued to be composed of Sanhaja recruits, but Ibn Tashfin also began recruiting slaves to form a personal guard (ḥashm), including 5000 black soldiers ('abid) and 500 white soldiers (uluj, likely of European origin).

At some point, Yusuf Ibn Tashfin moved to acknowledge the Abbasids caliphs in Baghdad as overlords. While the Abbasids themselves had little direct political power by this time, the symbolism of this act was important and enhanced Ibn Tashfin's legitimacy. According to Ibn Idhari, it was at the same time as this that Ibn Tashfin also took the title of amīr al-muslimīn ('Commander of the Muslims'). Ibn Idhari dates this to 1073–74, but some authors, including modern historian Évariste Lévi-Provençal, have dated this political decision to later, most likely when the Almoravids were in the process of securing control of al-Andalus. According to Amira Bennison, the recognition of the Abbasid caliph must have been established by the 1090s at latest. When Abu Bakr ibn al-Arabi visited Baghdad between 1096 and 1098, possibly as part of an Almoravid embassy to Caliph al-Mustazhir, he claimed that the Friday prayers were already being given in the Abbasid caliph's name across the territories ruled by Yusuf Ibn Tashfin.

=== Southern Almoravids and the Ghana Empire ===
After leaving Yusuf Ibn Tashfin in the north and returning south, Abu Bakr Ibn Umar reportedly made Azuggi his base. The town acted as the capital of the southern Almoravids under him and his successors. Despite the importance of the Saharan trade routes to the Almoravids, the history of the southern wing of the empire is not well documented in Arabic historical sources and is often neglected in histories of the Maghreb and al-Andalus. This has also encouraged a division in modern studies about the Almoravids, with archeology playing a greater role in the study of the southern wing, in the absence of more textual sources. The exact nature and impact of the Almoravid presence in the Sahel is a strongly debated topic among Africanists.

According to Arab tradition, the Almoravids under Abu Bakr's leadership conquered the Ghana Empire, founded by the Soninke, sometime around 1076–77. An example of this tradition is the record of historian Ibn Khaldun, who cited Shaykh Uthman, the faqih of Ghana, writing in 1394. According to this source, the Almoravids weakened Ghana and collected tribute from the Sudan, to the extent that the authority of the rulers of Ghana dwindled away, and they were subjugated and absorbed by the Sosso, a neighboring people of the Sudan. Traditions in Mali related that the Sosso attacked and took over Mali as well, and the ruler of the Sosso, Sumaouro Kanté, took over the land.

However, criticism from David Conrad, Humphrey Fisher, and Pekka Masonen has argued that the notion of any Almoravid military conquest at its core is merely perpetuated folklore, derived from a misinterpretation or naive reliance on Arabic sources. According to Professor Timothy Insoll, the archaeology of ancient Ghana simply does not show the signs of rapid change and destruction that would be associated with any Almoravid-era military conquests.

Dierke Lange agreed with the original military incursion theory but argues that this doesn't preclude Almoravid political agitation, claiming that the main factor of the demise of the Ghana Empire owed much to the latter. According to Lange, Almoravid religious influence was gradual, rather than the result of military action; there the Almoravids gained power by marrying among the nation's nobility. Lange attributes the decline of ancient Ghana to numerous unrelated factors, one of which is likely attributable to internal dynastic struggles instigated by Almoravid influence and Islamic pressures, but devoid of military conquest.

This interpretation of events has been disputed by later scholars like Sheryl L. Burkhalter, who argued that, whatever the nature of the "conquest" in the south of the Sahara, the influence and success of the Almoravid movement in securing west African gold and circulating it widely necessitated a high degree of political control.

The Arab geographer Ibn Shihab al-Zuhri wrote that the Almoravids ended Ibadi Islam in Tadmekka in 1084 and that Abu Bakr "arrived at the mountain of gold" in the deep south. Abu Bakr finally died in Tagant in November 1087 following an injury in battle—according to oral tradition, from an arrow—while fighting in the historic region of the Sudan.

After the death of Abu Bakr (1087), the confederation of Berber tribes in the Sahara was divided between the descendants of Abu Bakr and his brother Yahya, and would have lost control of Ghana. Sheryl Burkhalter suggests that Abu Bakr's son Yahya was the leader of the Almoravid expedition that conquered Ghana in 1076, and that the Almoravids would have survived the loss of Ghana and the defeat in the Maghreb by the Almohads, and would have ruled the Sahara until the end of the 12th century. Some local oral histories support this, describing a southern Almoravid dynasty that lasted 200 years after Abu Bakr's death. When it finally split apart in the 13th century, one branch (by now thoroughly integrated into the local culture of Takrur) may have been led by the legendary Ndiadiane Ndiaye, founder of the Jolof Empire.

=== Expansion into al-Andalus ===
Initially, it appears Ibn Tashfin had little interest in involving the Almoravids in the politics of al-Andalus (the Muslim territories on the Iberian Peninsula). After the collapse of the Caliphate of Córdoba in the early 11th century, al-Andalus had split into small kingdoms or city-states known as the Taifas. These states constantly fought with each other but were unable to raise large armies of their own, so they became reliant instead on the Christian kingdoms of the north for military support. This support was secured through the regular payment of parias (tributes) to the Christian kings, but the payments became a fiscal burden that drained the treasuries of these local rulers. In turn, the Taifa rulers burdened their subjects with increased taxation, including taxes and tariffs that were not considered legal under Islamic law. As the payments of tribute began to falter, the Christian kingdoms resorted to punitive raids and eventually to conquest. The Taifa kings were unwilling or unable to unite to counter this threat, and even the most powerful Taifa kingdom, Seville, was unable to resist Christian advances.

After the Almoravid capture of Ceuta (1083) on the southern shore of the Strait of Gibraltar, the way was now open for Ibn Tashfin to intervene in al-Andalus. It was in this same year that Alfonso VI, king of Castile and León, led a military campaign into southern al-Andalus to punish al-Mu'tamid of Seville for failing to pay him tribute. His expedition penetrated all the way to Tarifa, the southernmost point of the Iberian Peninsula. A couple of years later, in May 1085, he seized control of Toledo, previously one of the most powerful city-states in al-Andalus. Soon after, he also began a siege of Zaragoza. These dramatic events forced the Taifa kings to finally consider seeking an external intervention by the Almoravids. According to the most detailed Arabic source, it was al-Mu'tamid, the ruler of Seville, who convened a meeting with his neighbours, al-Mutawwakil of Badajoz and Abdallah ibn Buluggin of Granada, where they agreed to send an embassy to Ibn Tashfin to appeal for his assistance. The Taifa kings were aware of the risks that came with an Almoravid intervention but considered it the best choice among their bad options. Al-Mu'tamid is said to have remarked bitterly: "Better to pasture camels than to be a swineherd"—meaning that it was better to submit to another Muslim ruler than to end up as subjects of a Christian king.

As a condition for his assistance, Ibn Tashfin demanded that Algeciras (a city on the northern shore of the Strait of Gibraltar, across from Ceuta) be surrendered to him so he could use it as a base for his troops. Al-Mu'tamid agreed. Ibn Tashfin, wary of the hesitation of the Taifa kings, immediately sent an advance force of 500 troops across the strait to take control of Algeciras. They did so in July 1086 without encountering resistance. The rest of the Almoravid army, numbering around 12,000, soon followed. Ibn Tashfin and his army then marched to Seville, where they met up with the forces of al-Mu'tamid, al-Mutawwakil, and Abdallah ibn Buluggin. Alfonso VI, hearing of this development, lifted his siege of Zaragoza and marched south to confront them. The two sides met at a place north of Badajoz, called Zallaqa in Arabic sources and Sagrajas in Christian sources. In the Battle of Sagrajas (or Battle of Zallaqa), on 23 October 1086, Alfonso was soundly defeated and forced to retreat north in disorder. Al-Mu'tamid recommended that they press their advantage, but Ibn Tashfin did not pursue the Christian army further, returning instead to Seville and then to North Africa. It is possible he was unwilling to be away from his home base for too long or that the death of his eldest son, Sir, encouraged him to return.

After Ibn Tashfin's departure, Alfonso VI quickly resumed his pressure on the Taifa kings and forced them to send tribute payments again. He captured the fortress of Aledo, cutting off eastern al-Andalus from the other Muslim kingdoms. Meanwhile, Ibn Rashiq, the ruler of Murcia, was embroiled in a rivalry with al-Mu'tamid of Seville. As a result, this time it was the elites or notables (wujūh) of al-Andalus who now called for help from the Almoravids, rather than the kings. In May–June 1088, Ibn Tashfin landed at Algeciras with another army, soon joined by al-Mu'tamid of Seville, by Abdallah ibn Buluggin of Granada, and by other troops sent by Ibn Sumadih of Almería and Ibn Rashiq of Murcia. They then set out to retake Aledo. The siege, however, was undermined by rivalries and disunity among the Taifa kings. News eventually reached the Muslims that Alfonso VI was bringing an army to help the Castilian garrison. In November 1088, Ibn Tashfin lifted the siege and returned to North Africa again, having achieved nothing. Alfonso VI sent his trusted commander, Alvar Fañez, to pressure the Taifa kings again. He succeeded in forcing Abdallah ibn Buluggin to resume tribute payments and began to pressure al-Mu'tamid in turn.

In 1090, Ibn Tashfin returned to al-Andalus yet again, but by this point he seemed to have given up on the Taifa kings and now intended to take direct control of the region. The Almoravid cause benefited from the support of the Maliki fuqahā (Islamic jurists) in Al-Andalus, who extolled the Almoravid devotion to jihad while criticizing the Taifa kings as impious, self-indulgent, and thus illegitimate. In September 1090, Ibn Tashfin forced Granada to surrender to him and sent Abdallah ibn Buluggin into exile in Aghmat. He then returned to North Africa again, but this time he left his nephew, Sir ibn Abu Bakr, in charge of Almoravid forces in al-Andalus. Al-Mu'tamid, seeking to salvage his position, resorted to striking an alliance with Alfonso VI, which further undermined his own popular support. In early 1091, the Almoravids took control of Cordoba and turned towards Seville, defeating a Castilian force led Alvar Fañez that came to help al-Mu'tamid. In September 1091, al-Mu'tamid surrendered Seville to the Almoravids and was exiled to Aghmat. In late 1091, the Almoravids captured Almería. In late 1091 or January 1092, Ibn Aisha, one of Ibn Tashfin's sons, seized control of Murcia.

=== Campaigns against Valencia ===
The capture of Murcia brought the Almoravids within reach of Valencia, which was officially under the control of al-Qadir, the former Taifa ruler of Toledo. He had been installed here in 1086 by the Castilians after they took control of Toledo. Al-Qadir's unpopular rule in Valencia was supported by a Castilian garrison headed by Rodrigo Díaz de Vivar, a Castilian noble and mercenary better known today as El Cid. In October 1092, when El Cid was away from the city, there was an insurrection and coup d'état led by the qadi (judge) Abu Ahmad Ja'far Ibn Jahhaf. The latter called for help from the Almoravids in Murcia, who sent a small group of warriors to the city. The Castilian garrison was forced to leave and al-Qadir was captured and executed.

However, the Almoravids did not send enough forces to oppose El Cid's return and Ibn Jahhaf undermined his popular support by proceeding to install himself as ruler, acting like yet another Taifa king. El Cid began a long siege of the city, completely surrounding it, burning nearby villages, and confiscating the crops of the surrounding countryside. Ibn Jahhaf agreed at one point to pay tribute to El Cid in order to end the siege, which resulted in the Almoravids in the city being escorted out by El Cid's men. For reasons that remain unclear, an Almoravid relief army led by Ibn Tashfin's nephew, Abu Bakr ibn Ibrahim, approached Valencia in September 1093 but then retreated without engaging El Cid. Ibn Jahhaf continued negotiations. In the end, he refused to pay El Cid's tribute and the siege continued. By April 1094, the city was starving and he decided to surrender it shortly after. El Cid re-entered Valencia on 15 June 1094, after 20 months of siege. Rather than ruling through a puppet again, he now took direct control as king.

Meanwhile, also in 1094, the Almoravids seized control of the entire Taifa kingdom of Badajoz after its ruler, al-Mutawwakil, sought his own alliance with Castile. The Almoravid expedition was led by Sir ibn Abu Bakr, who had been appointed as governor of Seville. The Almoravids then returned their attention to Valencia, where another of Ibn Tashfin's nephews, Muhammad ibn Ibrahim, was ordered to take the city. He arrived outside its walls in October 1094 and began attacks on the city. The siege ended when El Cid launched a two-sided attack: he sent a sortie from one city gate that posed as his main force, occupying the Almoravid troops, while he personally led another force from a different city gate and attacked their undefended camp. This inflicted the first major defeat on the Almoravids on the Iberian Peninsula. After his victory, El Cid executed Ibn Jahhaf by burning him alive in public, perhaps in retaliation for treachery.

El Cid fortified his new kingdom by building fortresses along the southern approaches to the city to defend against future Almoravid attacks. In late 1096, Ibn Aisha led an army of 30,000 men to besiege the strongest of these fortresses, Peña Cadiella (just south of Xativa). El Cid confronted them and called on Aragon for reinforcements. When the reinforcements approached, the Almoravids lifted the siege, but laid a trap for El Cid's forces as they marched back to Valencia. They successfully ambushed the Christians in a narrow pass located between the mountains and the sea, but El Cid managed to rally his troops and repel the Almoravids yet again. In 1097, the Almoravid governor of Xativa, Ali ibn al-Hajj, led another incursion into Valencian territory but was quickly defeated and pursued to Almenara, which El Cid then captured after a three-month siege.

In 1097, Yusuf Ibn Tashfin himself led another army into al-Andalus. Setting out from Cordoba with Muhammad ibn al-Hajj as his field commander, he marched against Alfonso VI, who was in Toledo at the time. The Castilians were routed at the Battle of Consuegra. El Cid was not involved, but his son, Diego, was killed in the battle. Soon after, Alvar Fañez was also defeated near Cuenca in another battle with the Almoravids, led by Ibn Aisha. The latter followed up this victory by ravaging the lands around Valencia and defeated another army sent by El Cid. Despite these victories in the field, the Almoravids did not capture any major new towns or fortresses.

El Cid attempted to Christianize Valencia, converting its main mosque into a church and establishing a bishopric, but ultimately failed to attract many new Christian settlers to the city. He died on 10 July 1099, leaving his wife, Jimena, in charge of the kingdom. She was unable to hold off Almoravid pressures, which culminated in a siege of the city by the veteran Almoravid commander, Mazdali, in the early spring of 1102. In April–May, Jimena and the Christians who wished to leave the city were evacuated with the help of Alfonso VI. The Almoravids occupied the city after them.

That same year, with the capture of Valencia counting as another triumph, Yusuf Ibn Tashfin celebrated and arranged for his son, Ali ibn Yusuf, to be publicly recognized as his heir. The Taifa king of Zaragoza, the only other Muslim power left in the peninsula, sent an ambassador on this occasion and signed a treaty with the Almoravids. By the time Ibn Tashfin died in 1106, the Almoravids were thus in control of all of al-Andalus except for Zaragoza. In general, they had not reconquered any of the lands lost to the Christian kingdoms in the previous century.

=== Early reign of Ali ibn Yusuf ===
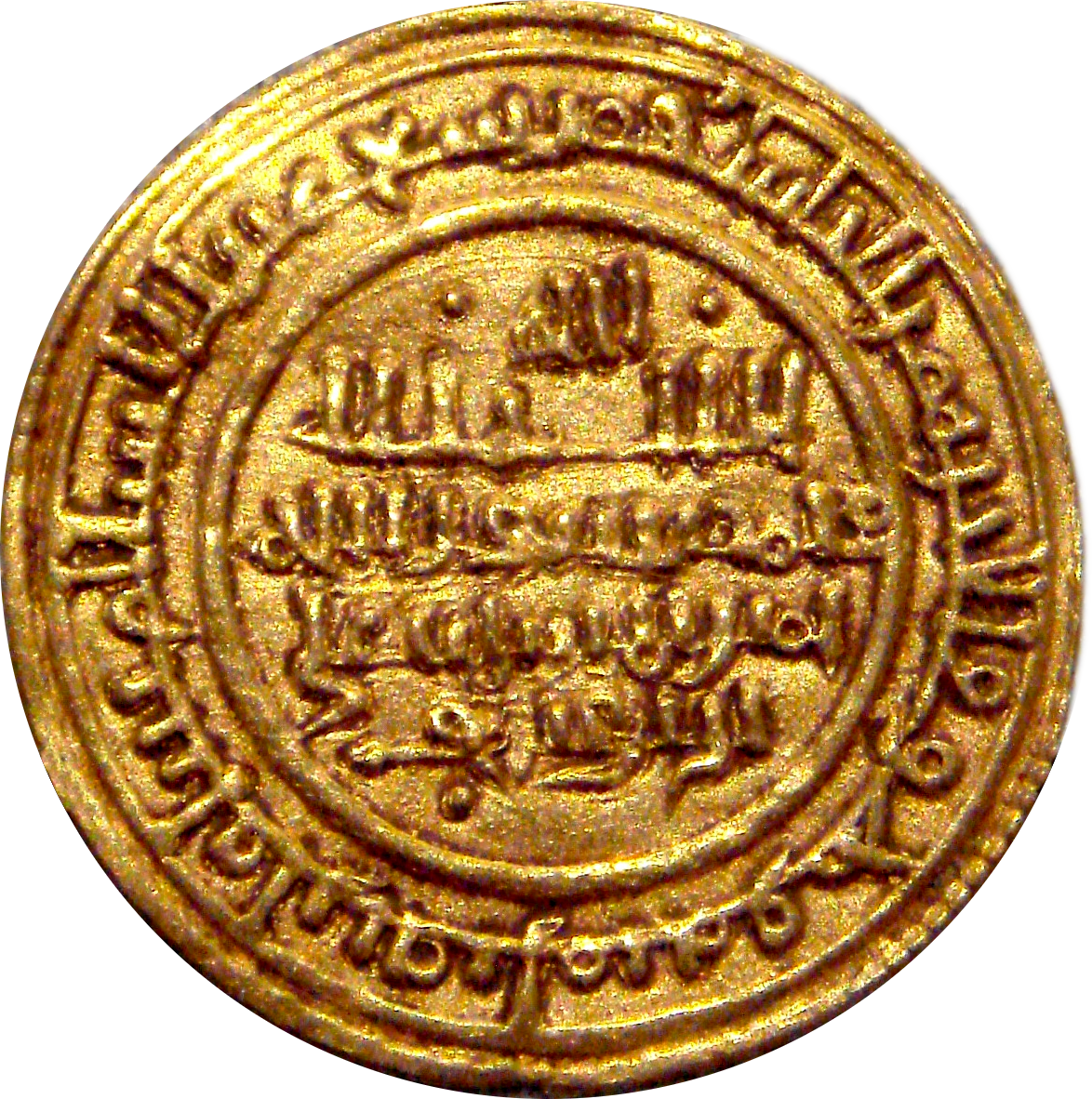
An Almoravid dinar coin from Seville, 1116. (British Museum); the Almoravid gold dinar would set the standard of the Iberian maravedí.

Ali Ibn Yusuf (r. 1106–1143) was born in Ceuta and educated in the traditions of al-Andalus, unlike his predecessors, who were from the Sahara. According to some scholars, Ali ibn Yusuf represented a new generation of leadership that had forgotten the desert life for the comforts of the city. His long reign of 37 years is historically overshadowed by the defeats and deteriorating circumstances that characterized the later years, but the first decade or so, prior to 1118, was characterized by continuing military successes, enabled in large part by skilled generals. While the Almoravids remained dominant in field battles, military shortcomings were becoming apparent in their relative inability to sustain and win long sieges. In these early years, the Almoravid state was also wealthy, minting more gold than ever before, and Ali ibn Yusuf embarked on ambitious building projects, especially in Marrakesh.

Upon his enthronement, Ali ibn Yusuf was accepted as the new ruler by most Almoravid subjects, except for his nephew, Yahya ibn Abu Bakr, the governor of Fes. Ali ibn Yusuf marched his army to the gates of Fes, causing Yahya to flee to Tlemcen. There, the veteran Almoravid commander, Mazdali, convinced Yahya to reconcile with his uncle. Yahya agreed, went on a pilgrimage to Mecca, and upon his return he was allowed to rejoin Ali Ibn Yusuf's court in Marrakesh.

Ali ibn Yusuf visited al-Andalus for the first time of his reign in 1107. He organized the Almoravid administration there and placed his brother Tamim as overall governor, with Granada acting as the administrative capital. The first major offensive in al-Andalus during his reign took place in the summer of 1108. Tamim, assisted by troops from Murcia and Cordoba, besieged and captured the small fortified town of Uclés, east of Toledo. Alfonso VI sent a relief force, led by the veteran Alvar Fañez, that was defeated on 29 May in the Battle of Uclés. The result was made worse for Alfonso VI because his son and heir, Sancho, died in the battle. In the aftermath, the Castilians abandoned Cuenca and Huete, which opened the way for an Almoravid invasion of Toledo. This came in the summer of 1109, with Ali Ibn Yusuf crossing over to lead the campaign in person. The death of Alfonso VI in June must have provided another advantage to the Almoravids. Talavera, west of Toledo, was captured on 14 August. Toledo itself, however, resisted under the leadership of Alvar Fañez. Unable to overcome the city's formidable defenses, Ali ibn Yusuf eventually retreated without capturing it.

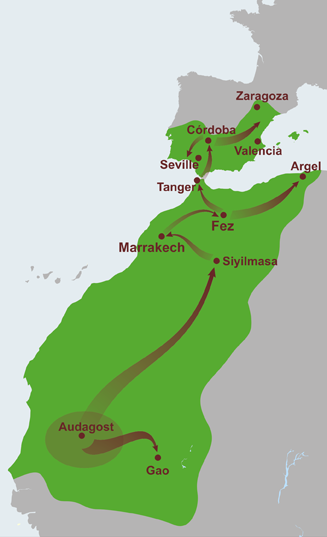
The Almoravid empire at its height stretched from the city of Aoudaghost to Zaragoza in Al-Andalus

Meanwhile, the Taifa king of Zaragoza, al-Musta'in, was a capable ruler but faced conflicting pressures. Like the previous Taifa rulers, he continued to pay parias to the Christian kingdoms to keep the peace, but popular sentiment within the city opposed this policy and increasingly supported the Almoravids. To appease this sentiment, al-Musta'in embarked on an expedition against the Christians of Aragon, but it failed. He died in battle in January 1110 at Valtierra. His son and successor, Imad al-Dawla, was unable to establish his authority and, faced with the threat of revolt, fled the city. Ali ibn Yusuf seized the opportunity and gave Muhammad ibn al-Hajj the task of capturing Zaragoza. On 30 May, Ibn al-Hajj entered the city with little opposition, ending the last independent Taifa kingdom.

The Almoravids remained on the offensive in the following years, but some of their best generals died during this time. In 1111, Sir ibn Abu Bakr (governor of Seville) campaigned in the west, occupying Lisbon and Santarém and securing the frontier along the Tagus River. Muhammad ibn al-Hajj continued to be active in the east. His expedition to Huesca in 1112 was the last time that Muslim forces operated near the Pyrenees. In 1114, he campaigned in Catalonia and raided across the region, aided by Ibn Aisha from Valencia. On their return march, however, the Almoravids were ambushed and both commanders were killed. In late 1113, Sir ibn Abu Bakr died. In 1115, it was Mazdali, one of the most veteran and loyal allies of Yusuf ibn Tashfin's family, who died in battle while serving as governor of Cordoba and campaigning to the north of it. Together, these deaths represented a major loss of senior and capable commanders for the Almoravids.

In 1115, the new governor of Zaragoza, Abu Bakr ibn Ibrahim ibn Tifilwit, besieged Barcelona for 27 days while Count Ramon Berengar III was in Majorca. They lifted the siege when the Count returned, but in that same year the Almoravids captured the Balearic Islands, which had been temporarily occupied by the Catalans and Pisans. The Almoravids occupied Majorca without a fight after the death of the last local Muslim ruler, Mubashir al-Dawla.

Ali ibn Yusuf made his third crossing into al-Andalus in 1117 to lead an attack on Coimbra. After only a short siege, however, he withdrew. His army raided along the way back to Seville and won significant spoils, but it was a further sign that Almoravid initiative was being depleted.

=== Decline ===
Almoravid fortunes began to turn definitively after 1117. While Léon and Castile were in disarray following the death of Alfonso VI, other Christian kingdoms exploited opportunities to expand their territories at the expense of the Almoravids. In 1118, Alfonso I El Batallador ('The Battler'), king of Aragon, launched a successful attack on Zaragoza with the help of the French crusader Gaston de Béarn. The siege of the city began on 22 May and, after no significant reinforcements arrived, it surrendered on 18 December. Ali ibn Yusuf ordered a major expedition to recover the loss, but it suffered a serious defeat at the Battle of Cutanda in 1120.

The crisis is evidence that Almoravid forces were over-extended across their vast territories. When the Almoravid governor of Zaragoza, Abd Allah ibn Mazdali, had died earlier in 1118, no replacement was forthcoming and the Almoravid garrison left in the city prior to the siege seems to have been very small. It is possible that Yusuf ibn Tashfin had understood this problem and had intended to leave Zaragoza as a buffer state between the Almoravids and the Christians, as suggested by an apocryphal story in the Hulul al-Mawshiya, a 14th-century chronicle, which reports that Ibn Tashfin, while on his deathbed, advised his son to follow this policy. Alfonso I's capture of Zaragoza in 1118, along with the union of Aragon with the counties of Catalonia in 1137, also transformed the Kingdom of Aragon into a major Christian power in the region. To the west, Afonso I of Portugal asserted his independent authority and effectively created the Kingdom of Portugal. The growing power of these kingdoms added to the political difficulties Muslims now faced in the Iberian Peninsula.

This major reversal precipitated a decline in popular support for the Almoravids, at least in al-Andalus. Andalusi society largely cooperated with the Almoravids on the understanding that they could keep the aggressive Christian kingdoms at bay. Once this was no longer the case, their authority became increasingly hollow. Their legitimacy was further undermined by the issue of taxation. One of the main appeals of early Almoravid rule had been its mission to eliminate non-canonical taxes (i.e. those not sanctioned by the Qur'an), thus relieving the people of a major fiscal burden. However, it was not feasible to finance Almoravid armies in the fight against multiple enemies across a large empire with the funding from Quranic taxes alone. Ali ibn Yusuf was thus forced to reintroduce non-canonical taxes while the Almoravids were losing ground.

These developments may have been factors in sparking an uprising in Cordoba in 1121. The Almoravid governor was besieged in his palace and the rebellion became so serious that Ali ibn Yusuf crossed over into al-Andalus to deal with it himself. His army besieged Cordoba but, eventually, a peace was negotiated between the Almoravid governor and the population. This was the last time Ali ibn Yusuf visited al-Andalus.

Alfonso I of Aragon inflicted further humiliations upon the Almoravids in the 1120s. In 1125, he marched down the eastern coast, reached Granada (though he refrained from besieging it), and devastated the countryside around Cordoba. In 1129, he raided the region of Valencia and defeated an army sent to stop him. The Almoravid position in al-Andalus was only shored up in the 1130s. In 1129, following Alfonso I's attacks, Ali ibn Yusuf sent his son (and later successor), Tashfin ibn Ali, to re-organize the military structure in al-Andalus. His governorship grew to include Granada, Almeria, and Cordoba, becoming in effect the governor of al-Andalus for many years, where he performed capably. The Banu Ghaniya clan, relatives of the ruling Almoravid dynasty, also became important players during this period. Yahya ibn Ali ibn Ghaniya was governor of Murcia up to 1133, while his brother was governor of the Balearic Islands after 1126. For much of the 1130s, Tashfin and Yahya led the Almoravid forces to a number of victories over Christian forces and reconquered some towns. The most significant was the Battle of Fraga in 1134, where the Almoravids, led by Yahya, defeated an Aragonese army besieging the small Muslim town of Fraga. Notably, Alfonso I El Batallor was wounded and died shortly after.

The greatest challenge to Almoravid authority came from the Maghreb, in the form of the Almohad movement. The movement was founded by Ibn Tumart in the 1120s and then continued after his death (c. 1130) under his successor, Abd al-Mu'min. They established their base at Tinmal, in the High Atlas mountains south of Marrakesh, and from here they progressively rolled back Almoravid territories. The struggle against the Almohads was immensely draining on Almoravid resources and contributed to their shortage of manpower elsewhere, including in al-Andalus. It also required the construction of large fortresses in the Almoravid heartlands in present-day Morocco, such as the fortress of Tasghimut. On Ali ibn Yusuf's orders, defensive walls were built around the capital of Marrakesh for the first time in 1126. In 1138, he recalled his son, Tashfin, to Marrakesh in order to assist in the fight against the Almohads. Removing him from al-Andalus only further weakened the Almoravid position there.

In 1138, the Almoravids suffered a defeat at the hands of Alfonso VII of León and Castile. In the Battle of Ourique (1139), they were defeated by Afonso I of Portugal, who thereby won his crown. During the 1140s, the situation grew steadily worse.

After Ali ibn Yusuf's death in 1143, his son Tashfin ibn Ali lost ground rapidly before the Almohads. In 1145, he was killed in a fall from a precipice while attempting to escape after a defeat near Oran. The Muridun staged a major revolt in southwestern Iberia in 1144 under the leadership of the Sufi mystic Ibn Qasi, who later passed to the Almohads. Lisbon was conquered by the Portuguese in 1147.

Tashfin's two successors were Ibrahim ibn Tashfin and Ishaq ibn Ali, but their reigns were short. The conquest of Marrakesh by the Almohads in 1147 marked the fall of the dynasty, though fragments of the Almoravids continued to struggle throughout the empire. Among these fragments, there was the rebel Yahya Al-Sahrāwiyya, who resisted Almohad rule in the Maghreb for eight years after the fall of Marrakesh before surrendering in 1155. Also in 1155, the remaining Almoravids were forced to retreat to the Balearic Islands and later Ifriqiya under the leadership of the Banu Ghaniya, who were eventually influential in the downfall of their conquerors, the Almohads, in the eastern part of the Maghreb.

== Emblem ==
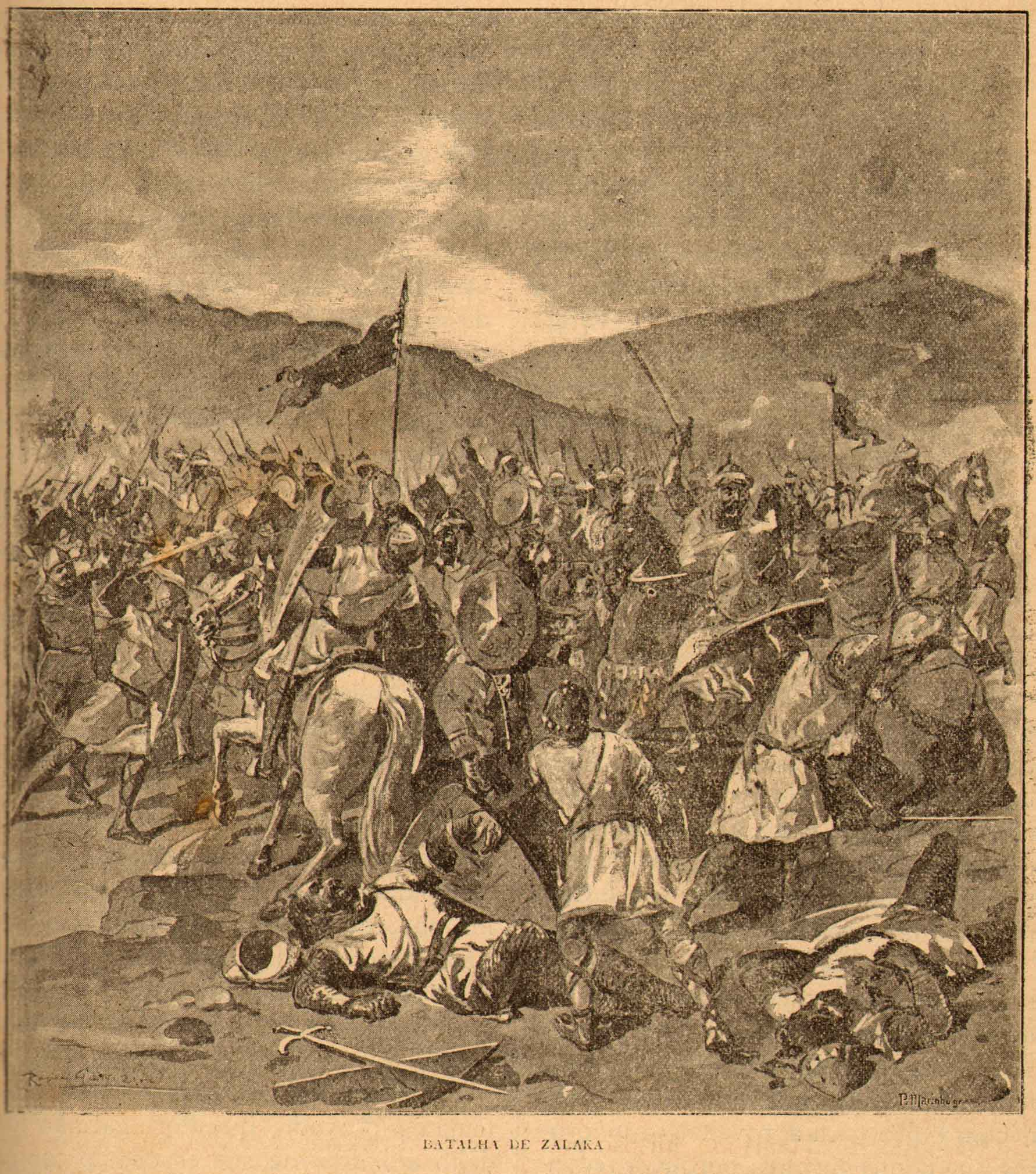
Black banners raised in the Battle of Sagrajas (1899 illustration by Alfredo Roque Gameiro)

The Almoravids adopted the Black standard, both to mark a religious character to their political and military movement as well as their religious and political legitimacy, which was demonstrated through their connection to the Abbasid Caliphate. According to some authors, the black color marked "the fight against impiety and error", it was also considered a representation of prophet Muhammad's flag. However, most sources indicate a clear affiliation with the Abbasid Caliphs, regarded as the supreme religious and secular authority of Sunni Islam. Historian Tayeb El-Hibri writes:

From far-off Maghreb, an emissary of the Almoravid Ali bin Yusuf bin Tashfin came to Baghdad in 498/1104 declaring allegiance to the Abbasids, announcing the adoption of the official Abbasid black for banners, and received the title Amir al-Muslimin wa Nasir "Amir al-Mu'minin" (prince of the Muslims and helper of the Commander of the Faithful).

Thus, the Almoravids adopted all the symbols of the Abbasids, including the color black (al-aswad), which would take part in the social and cultural life of the Almoravid tribes in their peace and war time. The desert tribes of Lamtuna and Massufa would adopt the black color for their veil when wrapped around the head, and for war banners in their battles in Al-Andalus.

Later on, the Black banner would be attested in clashes and uprisings opposing Almoravid and Almohad movements. The Almohads would adopt the white flag against Almoravid authority, while major anti-Almohad rebellions unleashed by the Banu Ghaniya in the Maghreb and Hudids in Al-Andalus would confirm their affiliation to the Abbasids in the same manner as the early Almoravid movement did.

== Culture ==
=== Religion ===
The Almoravid movement started as a conservative Islamic reform movement inspired by the Maliki school of jurisprudence. The writings of Abu Imran al-Fasi, a Moroccan Maliki scholar, influenced Yahya Ibn Ibrahim and the early Almoravid movement.

=== Art ===
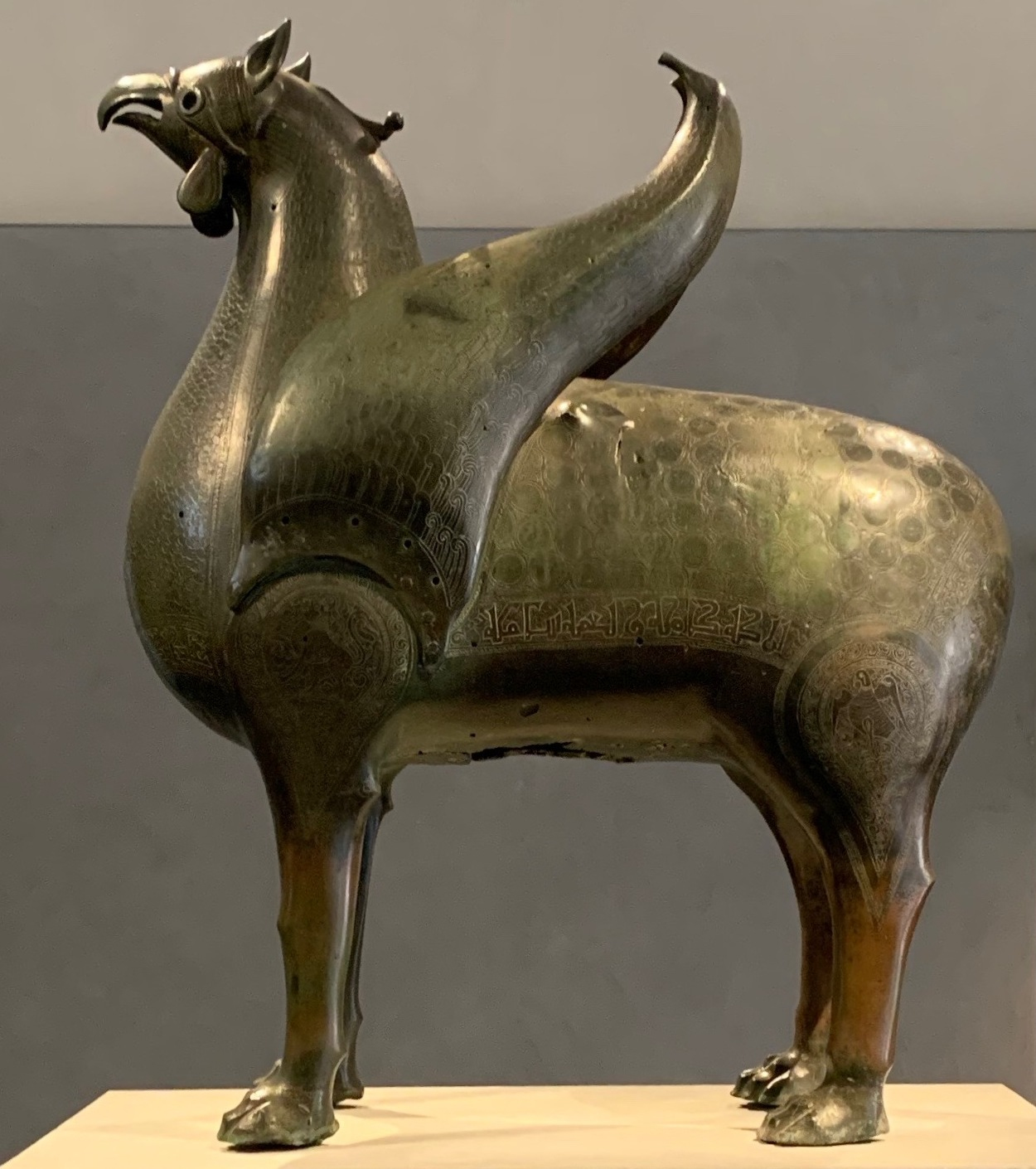
The Pisa Griffin, believed to have originated in 11th century Iberia.

Amira Bennison describes the art of the Almoravid period as influenced by the "integration of several areas into a single political unit and the resultant development of a widespread Andalusi–Maghribi style", as well as the tastes of the Sanhaja rulers as patrons of art. Bennison also challenges Robert Hillenbrand's characterization of the art of al-Andalus and the Maghreb as provincial and peripheral in consideration of Islamic art globally, and of the contributions of the Almoravids as "sparse" as a result of the empire's "puritanical fervour" and "ephemerality."

At first, the Almoravids, subscribing to the conservative Maliki school of Islamic jurisprudence, rejected what they perceived as decadence and a lack of piety among the Iberian Muslims of the Andalusi taifa kingdoms. However, monuments and textiles from Almería from the late Almoravid period indicate that the empire had changed its attitude with time.

Artistic production under the Almoravids included finely constructed minbars produced in Córdoba; marble basins and tombstones in Almería; fine textiles in Almería, Málaga, Seville; and luxury ceramics.

==== Marble work ====
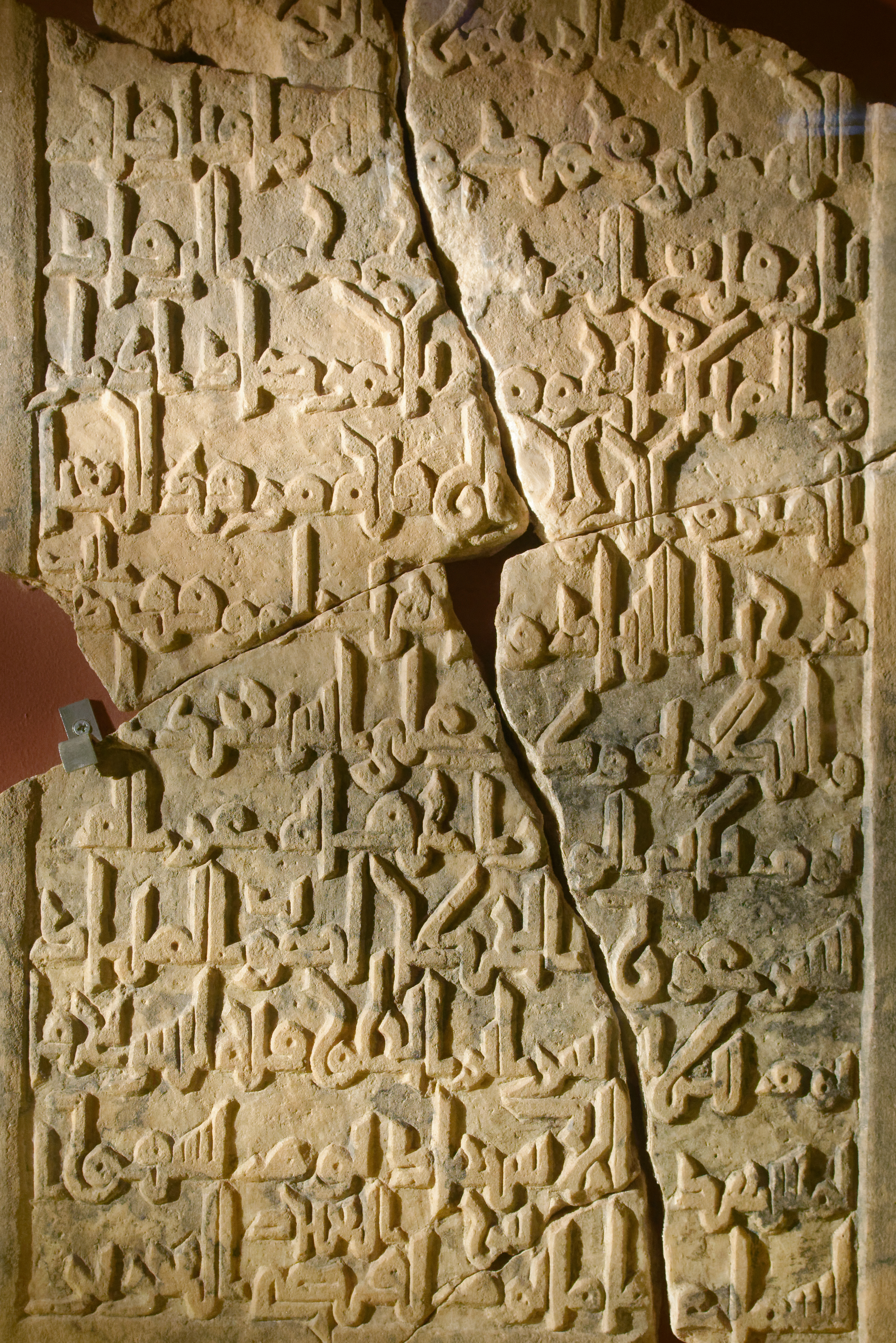
A stele found at Gao-Saney believed to have been created in Almería during the Almoravid period. Now located at the National Museum of Mali.

A large group of marble tombstones have been preserved from the first half of the 12th century. They were crafted in Almería in Al-Andalus, at a time when it was a prosperous port city under Almoravid control. The tombstones were made of Macael marble, which was quarried locally, and carved with extensive Kufic inscriptions that were sometimes adorned with vegetal or geometric motifs. These demonstrate that the Almoravids not only reused Umayyad marble columns and basins, but also commissioned new works. The inscriptions on them are dedicated to various individuals, both men and women, from a range of different occupations, indicating that such tombstones were relatively affordable. The stones take the form of either rectangular stelae or of long horizontal prisms known as mqabriyyas (similar to the ones found in the much later Saadian Tombs of Marrakesh). They have been found in many locations across West Africa and Western Europe, which is evidence that a wide-reaching industry and trade in marble existed. A number of pieces found in France were likely acquired from later pillaging. Some of the most ornate tombstones found outside Al-Andalus were discovered in Gao-Saney in the African Sahel, testament to the reach of Almoravid influence into the African continent.

Two Almoravid-period marble columns have also been found reused as spolia in later monuments in Fes. One is incorporated into the window of the Dar al-Muwaqqit (timekeeper's house) overlooking the courtyard of the Qarawiyyin Mosque, built in the Marinid period. The other is embedded into the decoration of the exterior southern façade of the Zawiya of Moulay Idris II, a structure which was rebuilt by Ismail Ibn Sharif.

==== Textiles ====
The fact that Ibn Tumart, leader of the Almohad movement, is recorded as having criticized Sultan Ali ibn Yusuf for "sitting on a luxurious silken cloak" at his grand mosque in Marrakesh indicates the important role of textiles under the Almoravids.

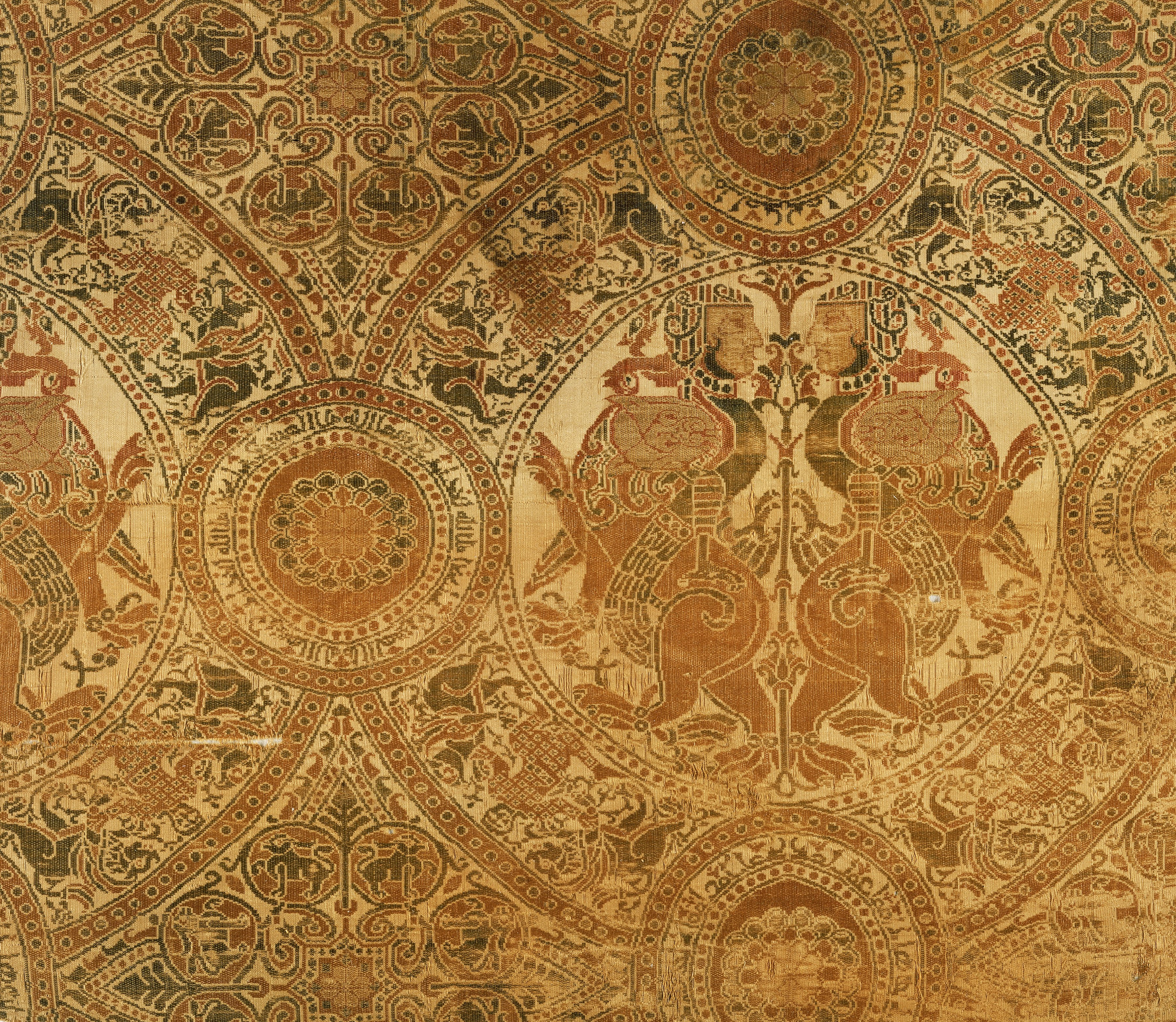
Fragment of the shroud of San Pedro de Osma, early 12th century: the imagery features pairs of lions and harpies, surrounded by men holding griffins

Many of the remaining fabrics from the Almoravid period were reused by Christians, with examples in the reliquary of San Isidoro in León, a chasuble from Saint-Sernin in Toulouse, the Chasuble of San Juan de Ortega in the church of Quintanaortuña (near Burgos), the shroud of San Pedro de Osma, and a fragment found at the church of Thuir in the eastern Pyrenees. Some of these pieces are characterized by the appearance of Kufic or "Hispano-Kufic" woven inscriptions, with letters sometimes ending in ornamental vegetal flourishes. The Chasuble of San Juan de Ortega is one such example, made of silk and gold thread and dating to the first half of the 12th century. The Shroud of San Pedro de Osma is notable for its inscription stating "this was made in Baghdad", suggesting that it was imported. However, more recent scholarship has suggested that the textile was instead produced locally in centres such as Almeria, but that they were copied or based on eastern imports. It is even possible that the inscription was knowingly falsified in order to exaggerate its value to potential sellers; Al-Saqati of Málaga, a 12th-century writer and market inspector, wrote that there were regulations designed to prohibit the practice of making such false inscriptions. As a result of the inscription, many of these textiles are known in scholarship as the "Baghdad group", representing a stylistically coherent and artistically rich group of silken textiles seemingly dating to reign of Ali ibn Yusuf or the first half of the 12th century. Aside from the inscription, the shroud of San Pedro de Osma is decorated with images of two lions and harpies inside roundels that are ringed by images of small men holding griffins, repeating across the whole fabric. The chasuble from Saint-Sernin is likewise decorated with figural images, in this case a pair of peacocks repeating in horizontal bands, with vegetal stems separating each pair and small kufic inscriptions running along the bottom.

The decorative theme of having a regular grid of roundels containing images of animals and figures, with more abstract motifs filling the spaces in between, has origins traced as far back as Persian Sasanian textiles. In subsequent periods, starting with the Almohads, these roundels with figurative imagery are progressively replaced with more abstract roundels, while epigraphic decoration becomes more prominent than before.

==== Calligraphy and manuscript illumination ====
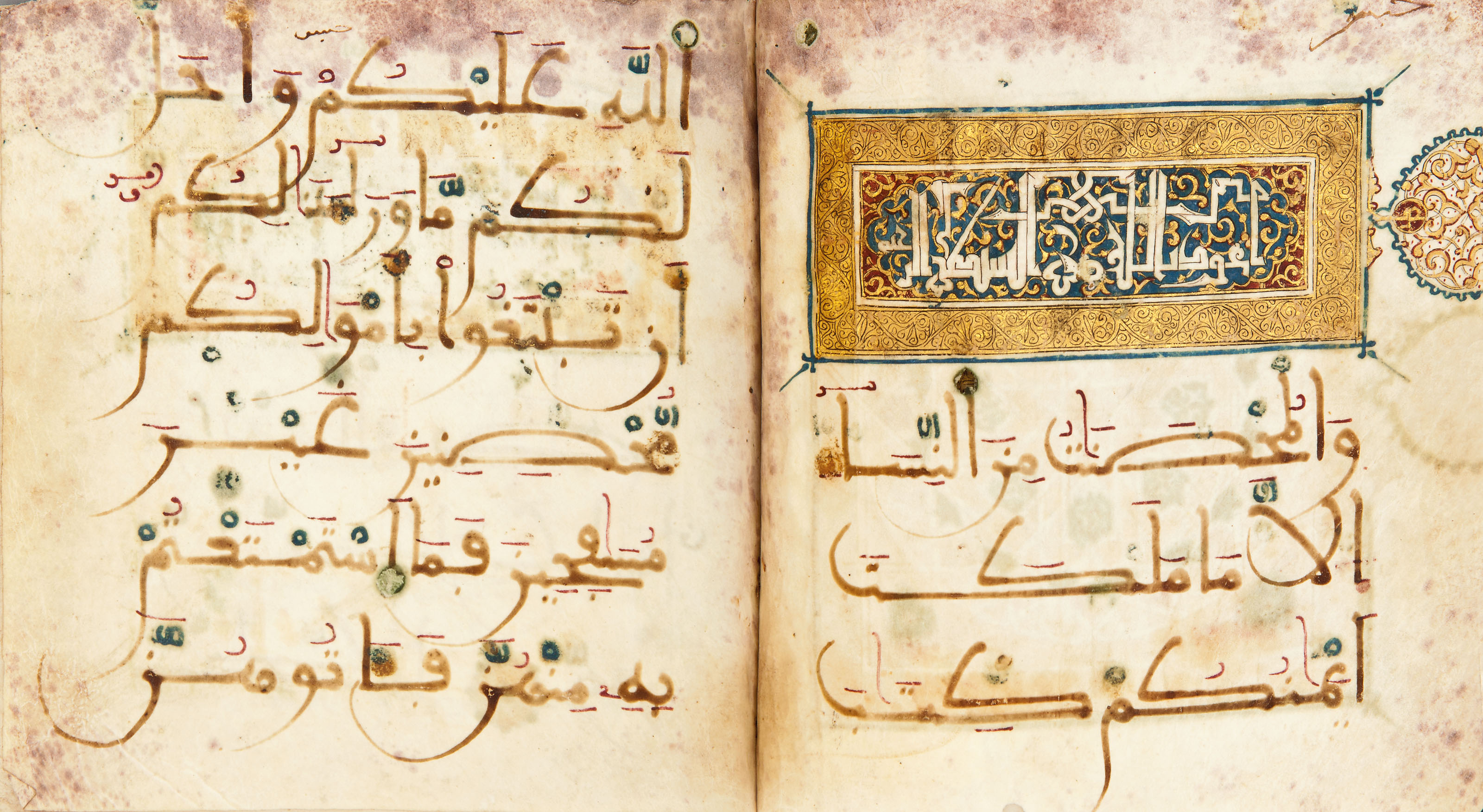
An illuminated Quran manuscript in florid Kufic and Maghrebi script.

In early Islamic manuscripts, Kufic was the main script used for religious texts. Western or Maghrebi Kufic evolved from the standard (or eastern) Kufic style and was marked by the transformation of the low swooping sections of letters from rectangular forms to long semi-circular forms. It is found in 10th century Qurans before the Almoravid period. Almoravid Kufic is the variety of Maghrebi Kufic script that was used as an official display script during the Almoravid period.

Eventually, Maghrebi Kufic gave rise to a distinctive cursive script known as "Maghrebi", the only cursive script of Arabic derived from Kufic, which was fully formed by the early 12th century under the Almoravids. This style was commonly used in Qurans and other religious works from this period onward, but it was rarely ever used in architectural inscriptions. One version of this script during this early period is the Andalusi script, which was associated with Al-Andalus. It was usually finer and denser, and while the loops of letters below the line are semi-circular, the extensions of letters above the line continue to use straight lines that recall its Kufic origins. Another version of the script is rounder and larger, and is more associated with the Maghreb, although it is nonetheless found in Andalusi volumes too.

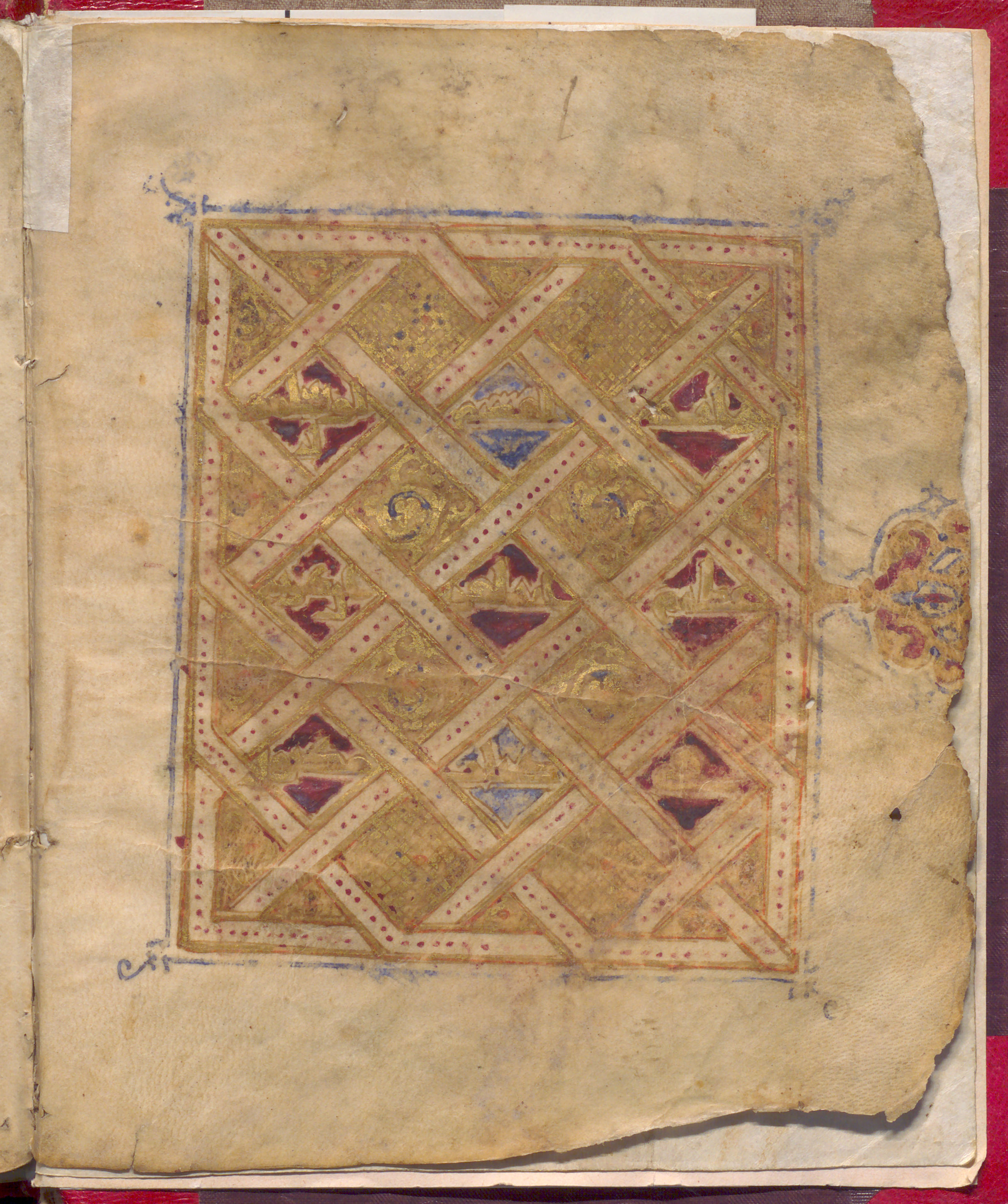
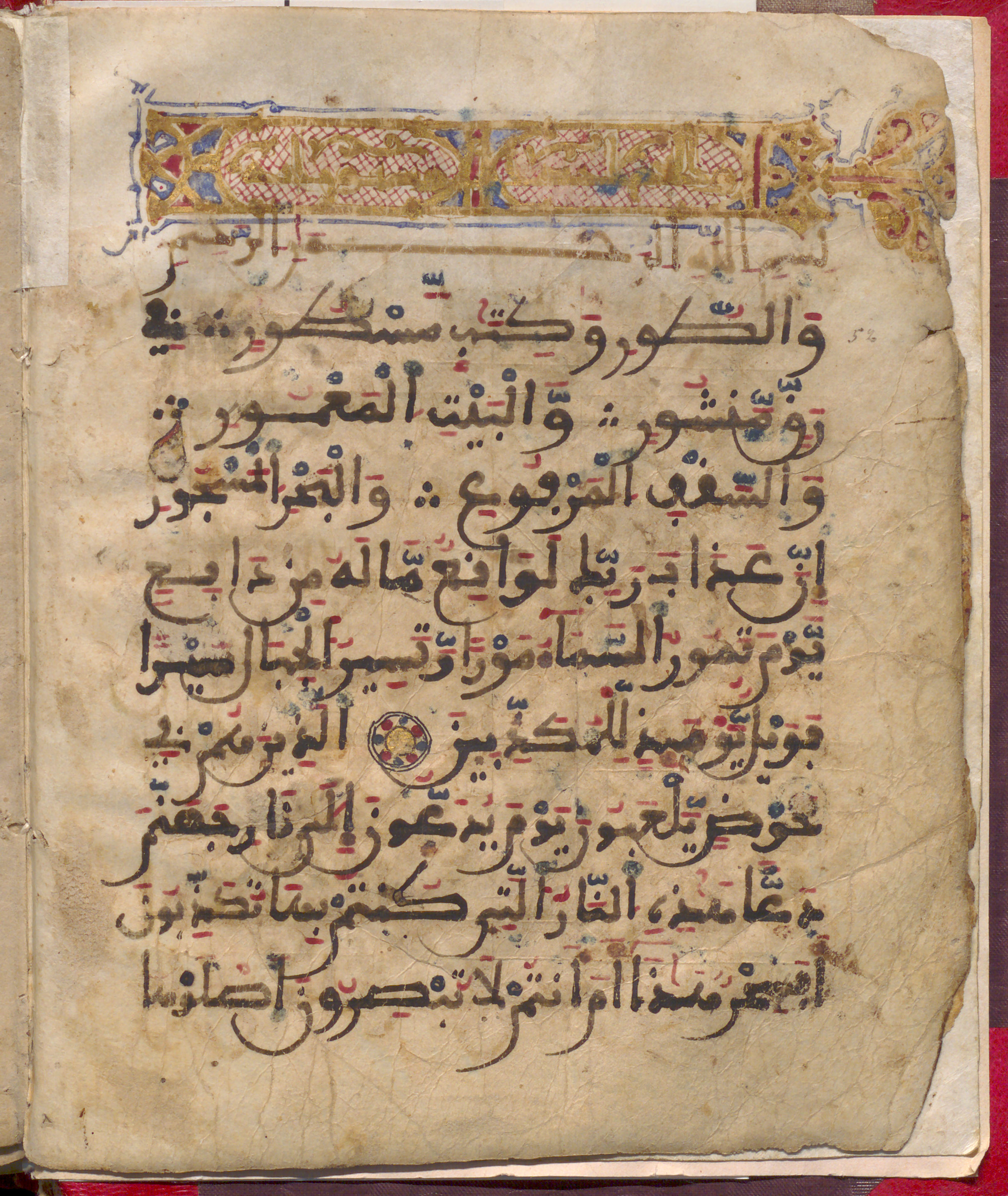
Part of the frontispiece (left) and a page from the text (right) of a Maghrebi or Andalusi Qur'an dated to 1090, the oldest known illuminated Qur'an from this region

The oldest known illuminated Quran from the western Islamic world (i.e. the Maghreb and Al-Andalus) dates from 1090, towards the end of the first Taifas period and the beginning of the Almoravid domination in Al-Andalus. It was produced either in the Maghreb or Al-Andalus and is now kept at the Uppsala University Library. Its decoration is still in the earliest phases of artistic development, lacking the sophistication of later volumes, but many of the features that were standard in later manuscripts are present: the script is written in the Maghrebi style in black ink, but the diacritics (vowels and other orthographic signs) are in red or blue, simple gold and black roundels mark the end of verses, and headings are written in gold Kufic inside a decorated frame and background. It also contains a frontispiece, of relatively simple design, consisting of a grid of lozenges variously filled with gold vegetal motifs, gold netting, or gold Kufic inscriptions on red or blue backgrounds.

More sophisticated illumination is already evident in a copy of a sahih dated to 1120 (during the reign of Ali ibn Yusuf), also produced in either the Maghreb or Al-Andalus, with a rich frontispiece centered around a large medallion formed by an interlacing geometric motif, filled with gold backgrounds and vegetal motifs. A similarly sophisticated Quran, dated to 1143 (at the end of Ali ibn Yusuf's reign) and produced in Córdoba, contains a frontispiece with an interlacing geometric motif forming a panel filled with gold and a knotted blue roundel at the middle.

==== Ceramics ====
The Almoravid conquest of al-Andalus caused a temporary rupture in ceramic production, but it returned in the 12th century. There is a collection of about 2,000 Maghrebi-Andalusi ceramic basins or bowls (bacini) in Pisa, where they were used to decorate churches from the early 11th to fifteenth centuries. There were a number of varieties of ceramics under the Almoravids, including cuerda seca pieces. The most luxurious form was iridescent lustreware, made by applying a metallic glaze to the pieces before a second firing. This technique came from Iraq and flourished in Fatimid Egypt.

==== Minbars ====
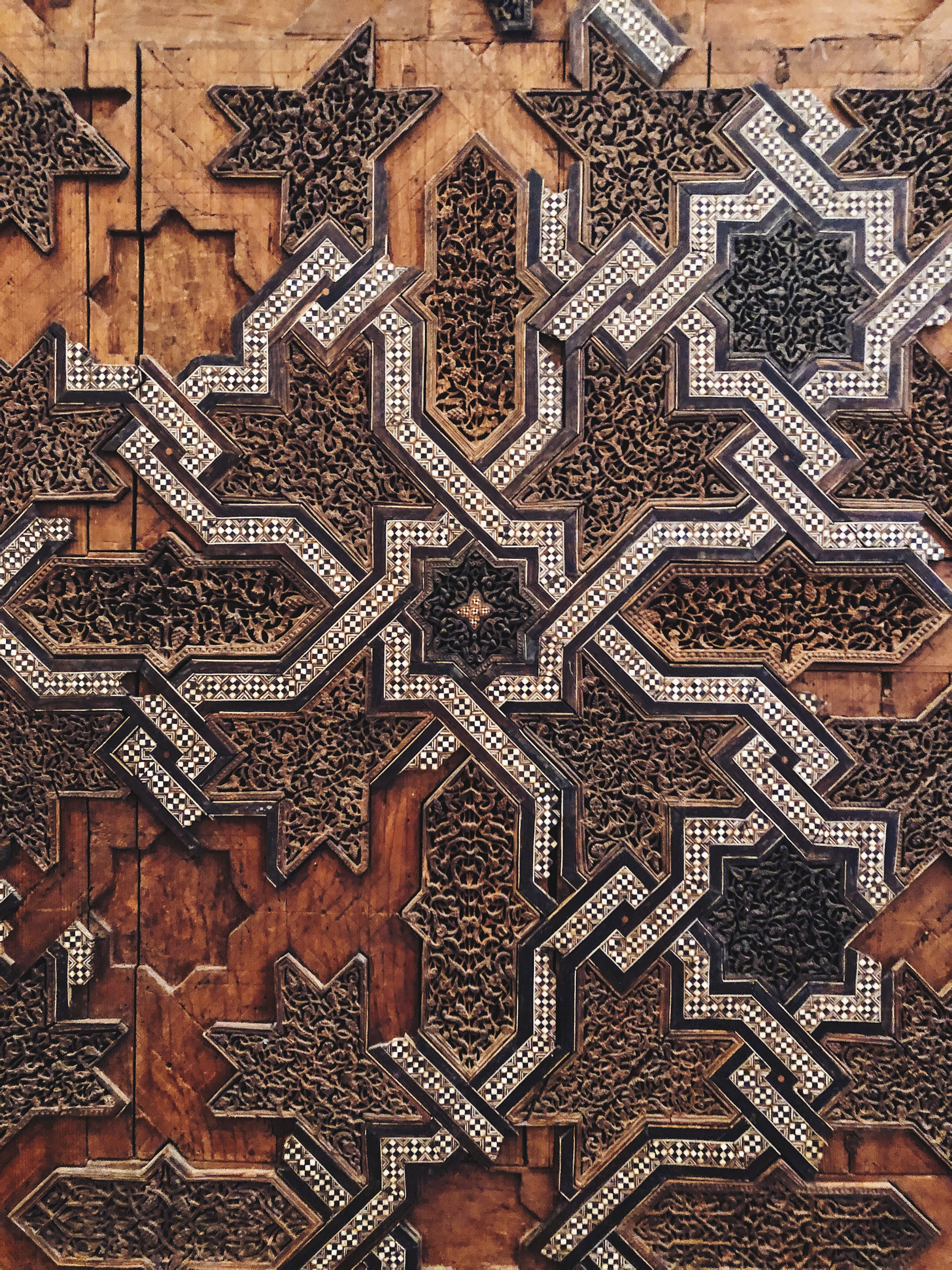
Detail of the Almoravid minbar, commissioned by Ali Bin Yusuf Bin Tashfin al-Murabiti 1137 for his great mosque in Marrakesh.

The Almoravid minbars—such as the minbar of the Grand Mosque of Marrakesh commissioned by Sultan Ali ibn Yusuf (1137), or the minbar for the University of al-Qarawiyyin (1144)—expressed the Almoravids' Maliki legitimacy, their "inheritance of the Umayyad imperial role", and the extension of that imperial power into the Maghreb. Both minbars are exceptional works of marquetry and woodcarving, decorated with geometric compositions, inlaid materials, and arabesque reliefs.

=== Architecture ===
The Almoravid period, along with the subsequent Almohad period, is considered one of the most formative stages of Moroccan and Moorish architecture, establishing many of the forms and motifs of this style that were refined in subsequent centuries. Manuel Casamar Perez remarks that the Almoravids scaled back the Andalusi trend towards heavier and more elaborate decoration which had developed since the Caliphate of Córdoba and instead prioritized a greater balance between proportions and ornamentation.

The two centers of artistic production in the Islamic west before the rise of the Almoravids were Kairouan and Córdoba, both former capitals in the region which served as sources of inspiration. The Almoravids were responsible for establishing a new imperial capital at Marrakesh, which became a major center of architectural patronage thereafter. The Almoravids adopted the architectural developments of al-Andalus, such as the complex interlacing arches of the Great Mosque in Córdoba and of the Aljaferia palace in Zaragoza, while also introducing new ornamental techniques from the east such as muqarnas ("stalactite" or "honeycomb" carvings).

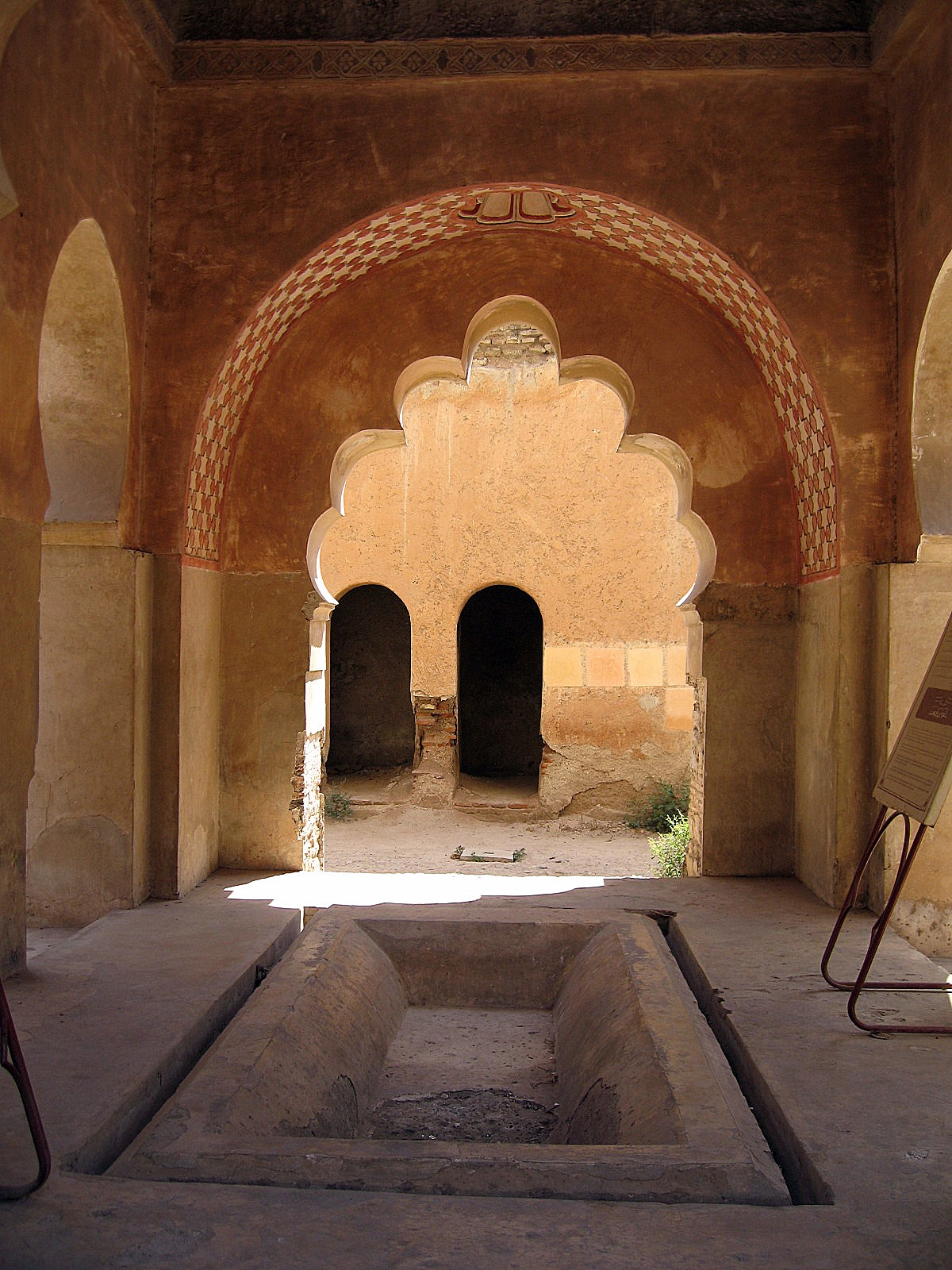
In their North African constructions, the Almoravids explored the use of cusping to make arches more decorative, as seen here in the Almoravid Qubba in Marrakesh.

After taking control of Al-Andalus in the Battle of Sagrajas, the Almoravids sent Muslim, Christian and Jewish artisans from Iberia to North Africa to work on monuments. The Great Mosque in Algiers (c. 1097), the Great Mosque of Tlemcen (1136) and al-Qarawiyyin (expanded in 1135) in Fez are important examples of Almoravid architecture. The Almoravid Qubba is one of the few Almoravid monuments in Marrakesh surviving, and is notable for its highly ornate interior dome with carved stucco decoration, complex arch shapes, and minor muqarnas cupolas in the corners of the structure. The central nave of the expanded Qarawiyyin Mosque notably features the earliest full-fledged example of muqarnas vaulting in the western Islamic world. The complexity of these muqarnas vaults at such an early date—only several decades after the first simple muqarnas vaults appeared in distant Iraq—has been noted by architectural historians as surprising. Another high point of Almoravid architecture is the intricate ribbed dome in front of the mihrab of the Great Mosque of Tlemcen, which likely traces its origins to the 10th-century ribbed domes of the Great Mosque of Córdoba. The structure of the dome is strictly ornamental, consisting of multiple ribs or intersecting arches forming a twelve-pointed star pattern. It is also partly see-through, allowing some outside light to filter through a screen of pierced and carved arabesque decoration that fills the spaces between the ribs.

Aside from more ornamental religious structures, the Almoravids also built many fortifications, although most of these in turn were demolished or modified by the Almohads and later dynasties. The new capital, Marrakesh, initially had no city walls but a fortress known as the Ksar el-Hajjar ("Fortress of Stone") was built by the city's founder, Abu Bakr ibn Umar, in order to house the treasury and serve as an initial residence. Eventually, circa 1126, Ali Ibn Yusuf also constructed a full set of walls, made of rammed earth, around the city in response to the growing threat of the Almohads. These walls, although much restored and partly expanded in later centuries, continue to serve as the walls of the medina of Marrakesh today. The medina's main gates were also first built at this time, although many of them have since been significantly modified. Bab Doukkala, one of the western gates, is believed to have best preserved its original Almoravid layout. It has a classic bent entrance configuration, of which variations are found throughout the medieval period of the Maghreb and Al-Andalus. Elsewhere, the archaeological site of Tasghîmût, southeast of Marrakesh, and Amargu, northeast of Fes, provide evidence about other Almoravid forts. Built out of rubble stone or rammed earth, they illustrate similarities with older Hammadid fortifications, as well as an apparent need to build quickly during times of crisis. The walls of Tlemcen (present-day Algeria) were likewise partly built by the Almoravids, using a mix of rubble stone at the base and rammed earth above.

In domestic architecture, none of the Almoravid palaces or residences have survived, and they are known only through texts and archaeology. During his reign, Ali Ibn Yusuf added a large palace and royal residence on the south side of the Ksar el-Hajjar (on the present site of the Kutubiyya Mosque). This palace was later abandoned and its function was replaced by the Almohad Kasbah, but some of its remains have been excavated and studied in the 20th century. These remains have revealed the earliest known example in Morocco of a riad garden (an interior garden symmetrically divided into four parts). In 1960 other excavations near Chichaoua revealed the remains of a domestic complex or settlement dating from the Almoravid period or even earlier. It consisted of several houses, two hammams, a water supply system, and possibly a mosque. On the site were found many fragments of architectural decoration which are now preserved at the Archeological Museum of Rabat. These fragments are made of deeply-carved stucco featuring Kufic and cursive Arabic inscriptions as well as vegetal motifs such as palmettes and acanthus leaves. The structures also featured painted decoration in red ochre, typically consisting of border motifs composed of two interlacing bands. Similar decoration has also been found in the remains of former houses excavated in 2006 under the 12th-century Almoravid expansion of the Qarawiyyin Mosque in Fes. In addition to the usual border motifs were larger interlacing geometric motifs as well as Kufic inscriptions with vegetal backgrounds, all executed predominantly in red.

Almoravid architecture

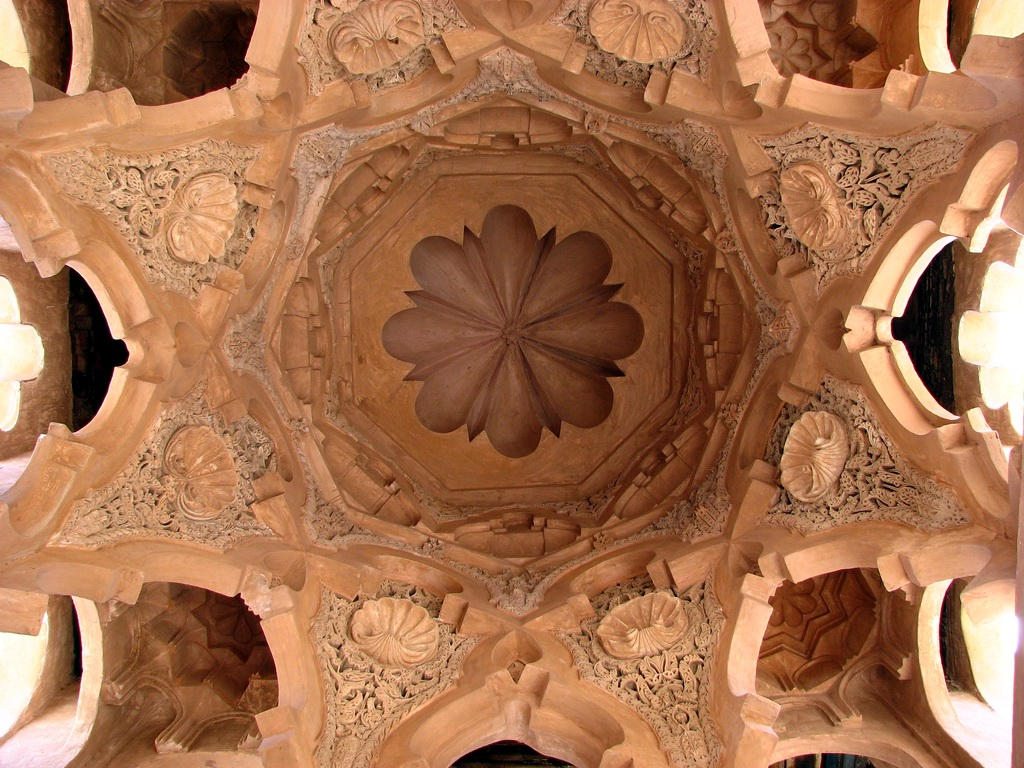
The Almoravid Qubba in Marrakesh.

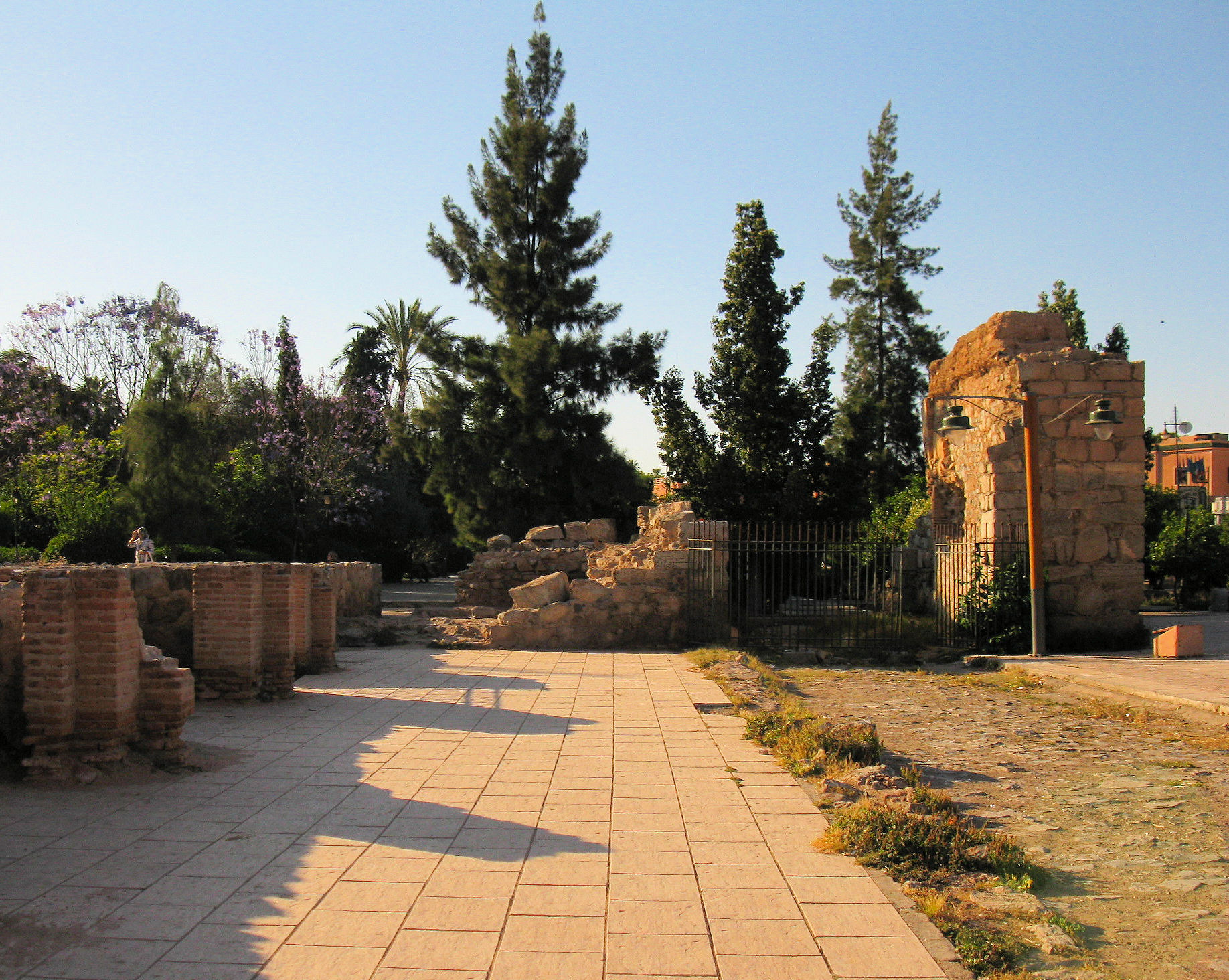
Remains of Bab 'Ali (right), a stone gate built for Ali ibn Yusuf's palace in Marrakesh next to the Ksar el-Hajjar fortress

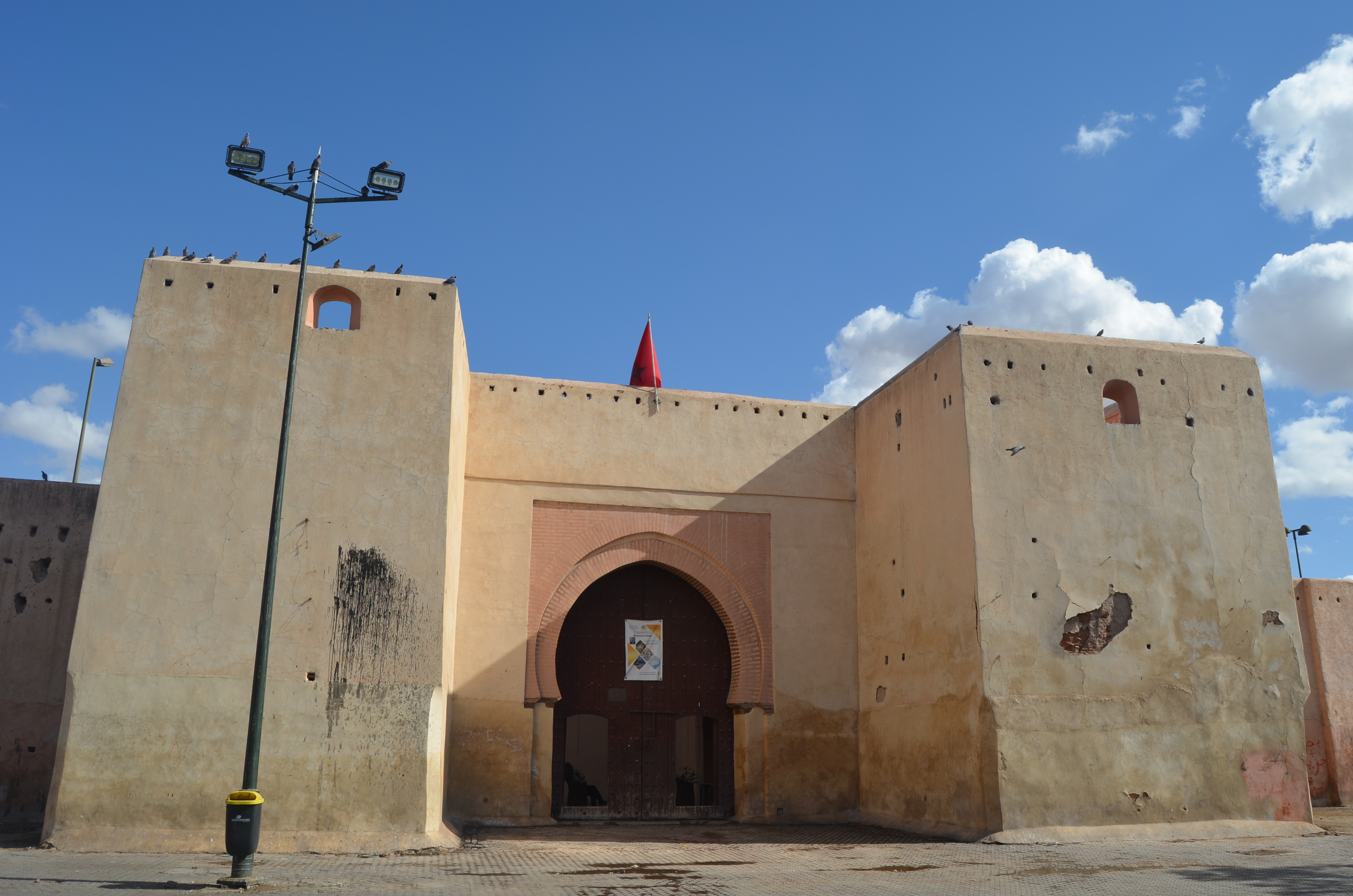
Bab Doukkala, one of the original gates of Marrakesh constructed circa 1126

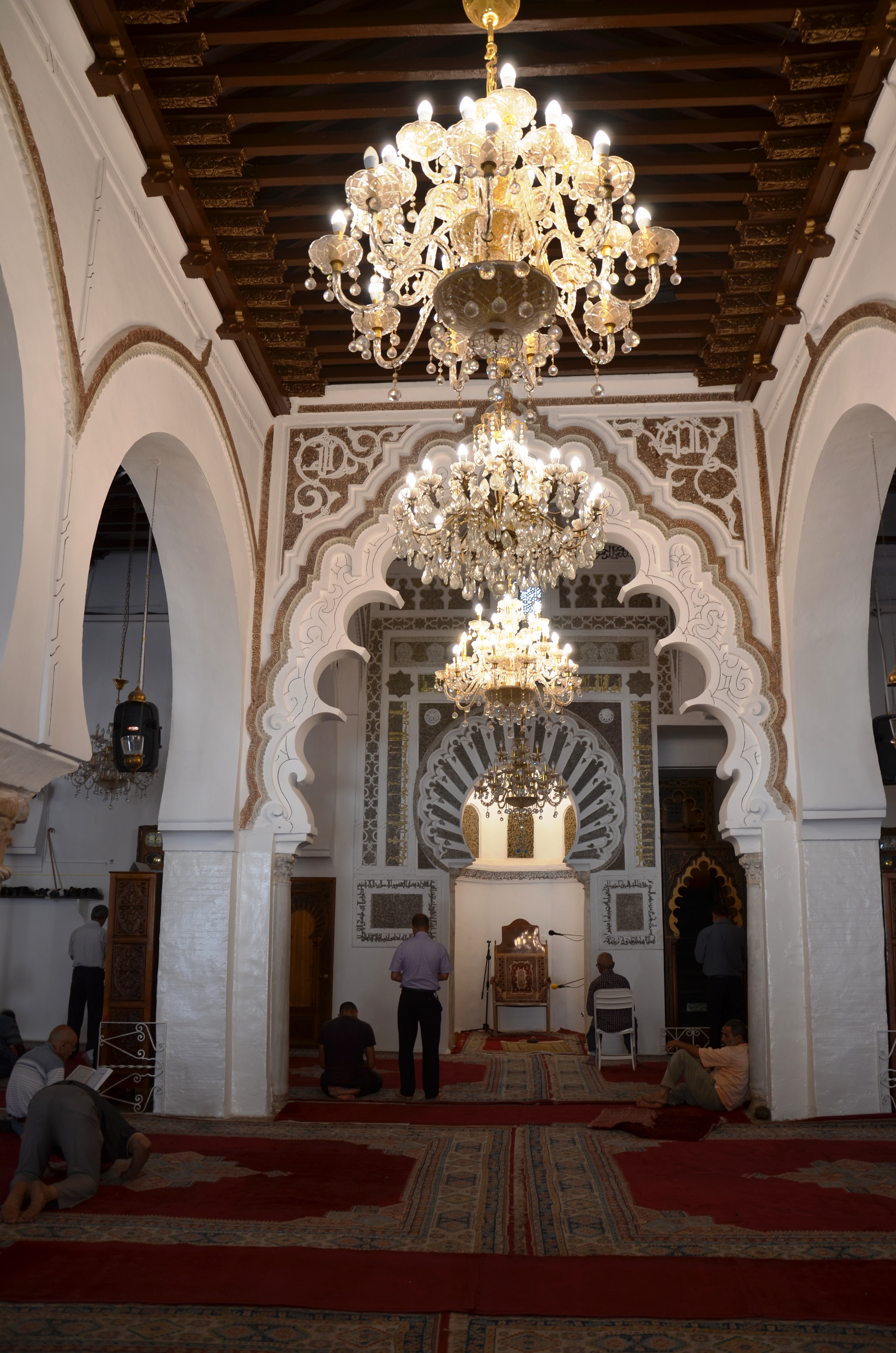
Interior of the Great Mosque of Tlemcen

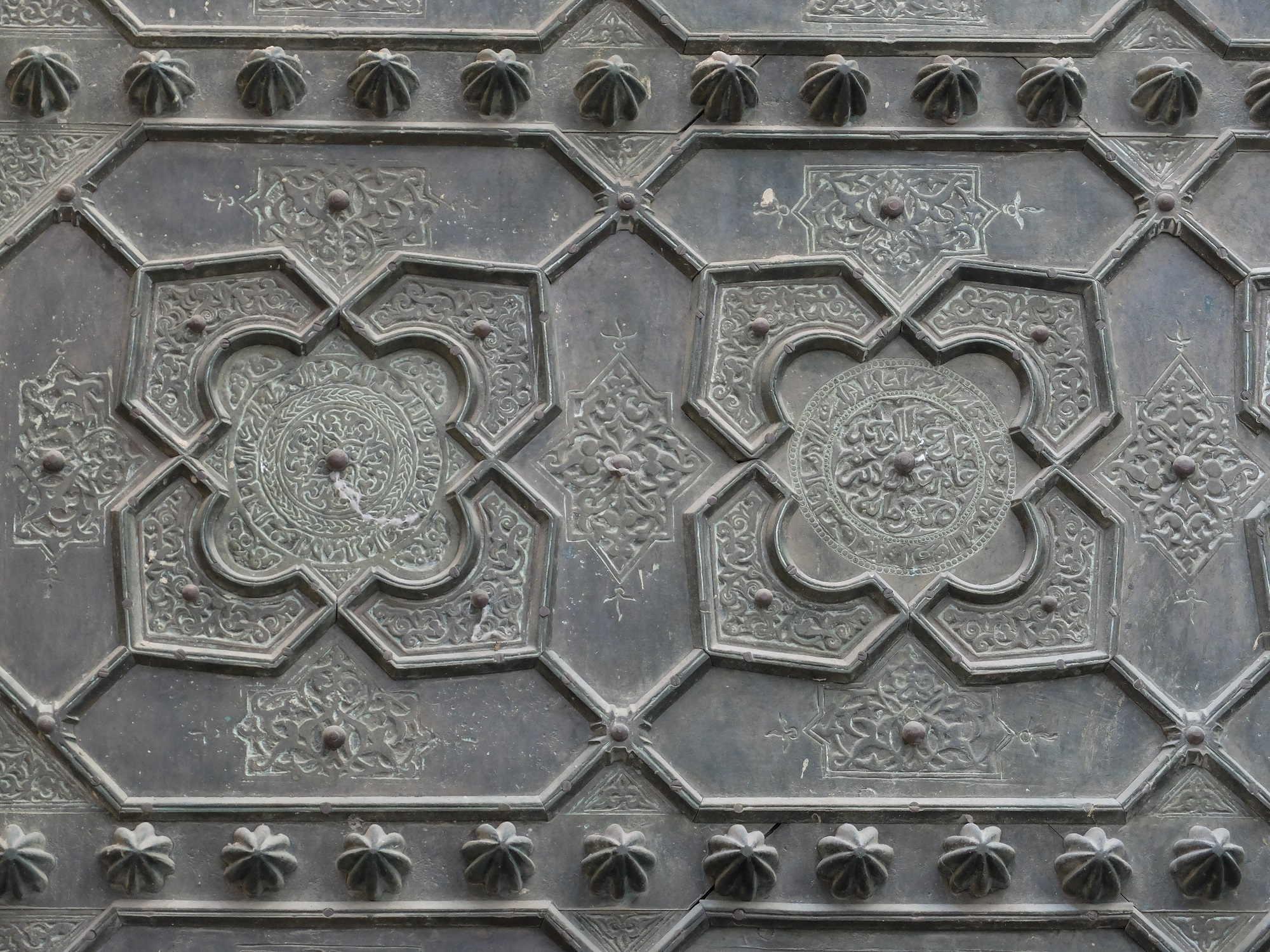
Detail of the Almoravid-era bronze overlays on the doors of al-Qarawiyyin's Bab al-Gna'iz.

=== Literature ===
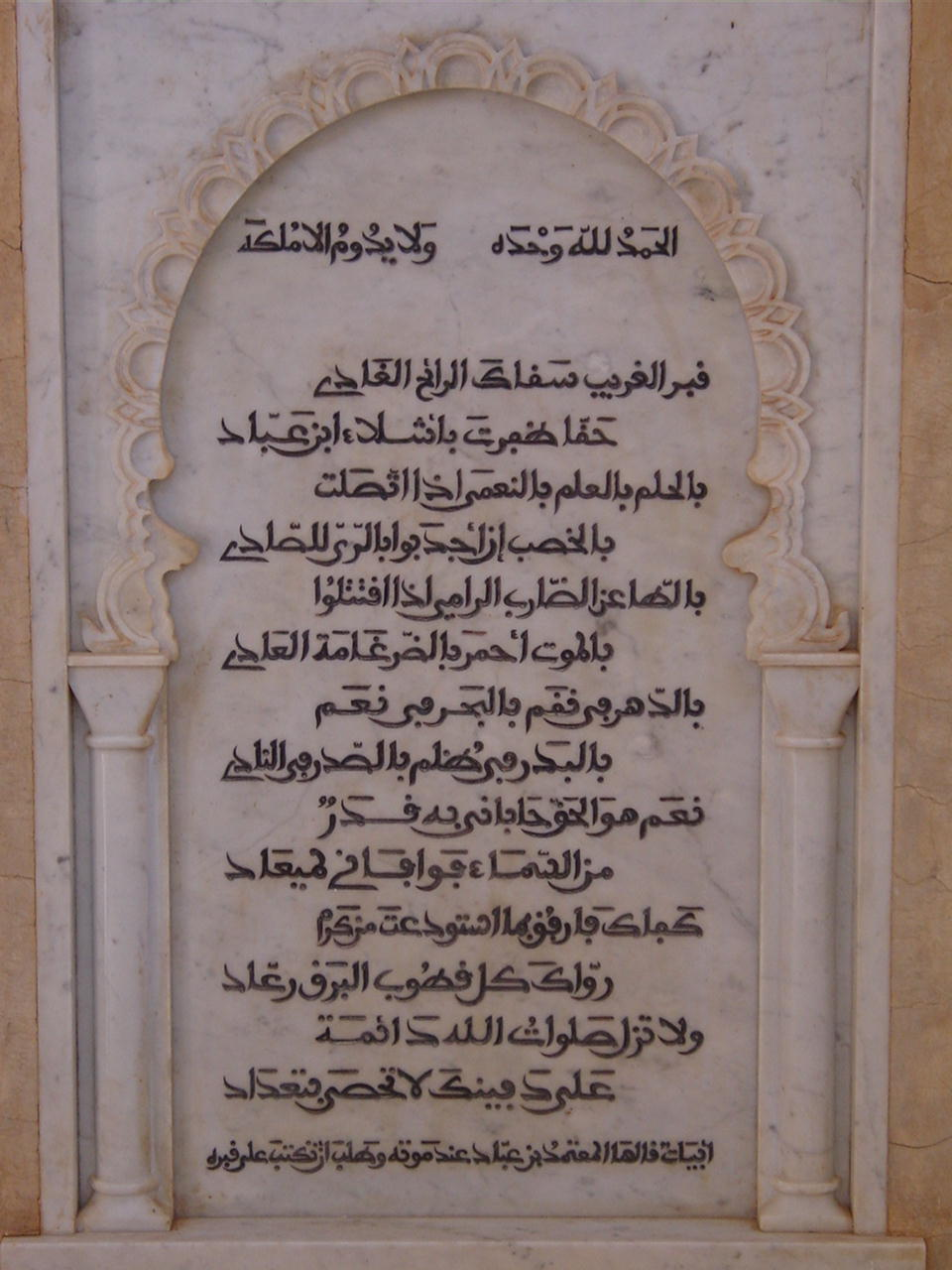
A plaque at the burial place of the Poet King Al-Mu'tamid ibn Abbad, interred 1095 in Aghmat, Morocco.

The Almoravid movement has its intellectual origins in the writings and teachings of Abu Imran al-Fasi, who first inspired Yahya Ibn Ibrahim of the Guddala tribe in Kairouan. Ibn Ibrahim then inspired Abdallah ibn Yasin to organize for jihad and start the Almoravid movement.

The Moroccan historian Muhammad al-Manuni noted that there were 104 paper mills in Fez under Yusuf ibn Tashfin in the 11th century.

Moroccan literature flourished in the Almoravid period. The political unification of Morocco and al-Andalus under the Almoravid dynasty rapidly accelerated the cultural interchange between the two continents, beginning when Yusuf ibn Tashfin sent al-Mu'tamid ibn Abbad, former poet king of the Taifa of Seville, into exile in Tangier and ultimately Aghmat.

The historians Ibn Hayyan, Al-Bakri, Ibn Bassam, and al-Fath ibn Khaqan all lived in the Almoravid period. Ibn Bassam authored Dhakhīra fī mahāsin ahl al-Jazīra, Al-Fath ibn Khaqan authored Qala'idu l-'Iqyan, and Al-Bakri authored al-Masālik wa ’l-Mamālik (Book of Roads and Kingdoms).

In the Almoravid period, two writers stand out: Qadi Ayyad and Avempace. Ayyad is known for having authored Kitāb al-Shifāʾ bī Taʾrif Ḥuqūq al-Muṣṭafá. Many of the Seven Saints of Marrakesh were men of letters.

==== Poetry ====
The muwashshah was an important form of poetry and music in the Almoravid period. Great poets from the period are mentioned in anthologies such as Kharidat al Qasar, Rawd al-Qirtas, and Mu'jam as-Sifr.

In the European portion of the Almoravid domain, poets such as Ibn Quzman produced popular zajal strophic poetry in vernacular Andalusi Arabic. In the Almoravid period, several Andalusi poets expressed contempt for the city of Seville, the European capital of the Almoravids.

== Military organization ==
Abdallah ibn Yasin imposed very strict disciplinary measures on his forces for every breach of his laws. The Almoravids' first military leader, Yahya ibn Umar al-Lamtuni, gave them a good military organization. Their main force was infantry, armed with javelins in the front ranks and pikes behind, which formed into a phalanx, and was supported by camelmen and horsemen on the flanks. They also had a flag carrier at the front who guided the forces behind him; when the flag was upright, the combatants behind would stand and when it was turned down, they would sit.

Al-Bakri reports that, while in combat, the Almoravids did not pursue those who fled in front of them. Their fighting was intense and they did not retreat when disadvantaged by an advancing opposing force; they preferred death over defeat. These characteristics were possibly unusual at the time.

=== Legends ===
After the death of El Cid, Christian chronicles reported a legend of a Turkish woman leading a band of 300 "Amazons", black female archers. This legend was possibly inspired by the ominous veils on the faces of the warriors and their dark skin colored blue by the indigo of their robes.

=== Navy ===
The Almoravids possessed a significant navy primarily to secure the strait of Gibraltar, vital for the ferrying of North African troops to Iberia, including the 6 crossings of Yusuf ibn Tashfin himself (1086, 1088, 1090-1091, 1094, 1097 and 1102) - mainly from Ksar es-Seghir or Ceuta. Overall the Almoravids had access to around 18 major ports: Tortosa, Dénia, Ibiza, Alicante, Almería, Málaga, Algeciras, Seville, Saltes (Huelva), Faro, Silves, Alcácer do Sal, as well as Tangier, Ceuta, Badis, Honaine, Oran and Algiers - giving them significant capacity for naval mobilisation and trade. Moroccan Atlantic infrastructure was still nascent; ports such as Safi and Salé served as minor anchorages, with major expansion reserved for the Almohad era

==== Origins ====
The Almoravid navy was born from Yusuf ibn Tashfin's failure to capture Ceuta in 1078 due to a lack of sea power, after which he immediately commissioned a fleet of galleys - though the city was eventually seized using borrowed Andalusi ships before his own navy was ready for service. Nearby, he founded a new shipyard at Ksar es-Seghir to better secure the Strait and adopted a similar policy at Algeciras, demanding the evacuation of its Sevillian garrison to ensure the crossing remained under his direct command, instead of depending on the ever fickle Andalusis - a foresight validated by al-Mu'tamid's later betrayal, the subsequent 1091 siege of Seville saw the destruction of the Abbadid fleet.

The organization of the navy was based upon the naval foundations set by the Caliphate of Cordoba, such as the seat of the admiralty being located at Almería and secondarily at Seville. Command of the fleet was entrusted to the Banu Maymun clan, originally hailing from Dénia, a city with strong maritime tradition. Throughout the entire Almoravid period the admiralty was in their hands, with Abu ‘Abd Allah Muhammad ibn Maymun given the title "Qa'id al-Ustul" (Commander of the Fleet). His brother's Lubb b. Maymun, Isa b. Maymun and the latters son Ali b. Isa commanded the Almoravid squadrons, with the last two becoming Admirals of Seville, and playing a significant role in the development of Cádiz. Their later defection to the Almohads, giving them the great arsenals of Seville and Almeria, was a deadly blow to the Almoravids, as the powerful fleets of the Banu Maymun and their extensive experience allowed them to take almost all remaining Almoravid ports with ease.

==== Warfare ====
The Almoravids used these fleets far and wide, from the Atlantic to the Central and even Eastern Mediterranean. In 1105/6 Yusuf ibn Tashfin sent a fleet of 70 ships to Jerusalem to fight against the crusaders, but all the ships sank in a storm. In 1120 Lubb, Isa and his son Ali commanded the Seville squadron for an expedition into the Atlantic, raiding Galicia. They also attacked Italy in reprisal for Norman raids, retaliating in 1118 with a force of 25 ships. In 1122, Admiral Abu ‘Abd Allah Muhammad ibn Maymun raided Calabria with 17 ships, capturing Nicotera and 5 years later in 1127 sacking Patti and Syracuse. In 1137 Southern Italy was raided once more by 27 ships. Almoravid naval strength might have been underestimated since they seem to have rarely engaged in open naval battle with the Christians.

The navy was also used for defence, In 1107, the Norwegian Crusade led by Sigurd was confronted by an Almoravid fleet north of the Tagus, though they managed to sink 8 Muslim ships. After their attempts on Sintra, Lisbon and Alcácer do Sal they were met by yet another Almoravid fleet. However, the Almoravids never attempted a more systematic and ambitious use of their navy to support their offensives, instead they were content with a few large-scale raids.

==== Maritime prosperity ====
The political unification of the vast Almoravid realm, along with the surge of sub-saharan gold brought with it prosperity and a significant maritime boom. With Almeria in particular becoming a great commercial metropolis and the largest industrial centre in all Andalus, home to workshops ranging from silk weaving to copper smithing, boasting over 800 for the manufacture of Tiraz. Frequented by merchants from as far as Syria as well as a strong silk and metal trade with Alexandria. Andalus also boasted a large timber industry, wchich was important for shipbuilding, the wood of the Sierra de Segura would be sent down the Júcar river to the shipyards of Denia and Valenica, while the huge pines of Tortosa was prized for the masts. Saltes-Huelva was a major centre of ironworking and naval metallurgy. The seaborne trade between Andalus and the Maghreb also expanded, with ships regularly travelling beyond the Cape Spartel along the Atlantic coast to the northern fringe of the Sahara. The Atlantic Moroccan port of Salé became a bustling hub frequented by ships from all over Andalus, importing Sevillian olive oil, and exporting large quantities of grain from Anfa(Casablanca). Ceuta was enriched through being terminus of the great trans-Saharan trade route (Ceuta-Fez-Marrakesh-Aghmat-Sijilmassa-Tamdoult-Azougui-Aoudaghost-Senegal). Other coastal towns such as Málaga, Algecerias, Valencia, Denia, Sesimbra, Lisbon, Sines, Oran also had significant economic expansion in this era.

==== Decline ====
However, the Almoravids also faced significant naval setbacks due to the rise of Italian naval power, chiefly Genoa and Pisa, as shown in the 1113–1115 Balearic Islands expedition. In the late Almoravid period this got much worse, with Genoese consul Caffaro assaulting Minorca in 1146. Just a year later Almeria, the seat of the admiralty itself, was brutally sacked by the Genoese, and subsequently occupied by the Castilians for the next decade. The city never fully recovered from this blow; even after returning to Islamic hands, it failed to reach its former Almoravid-era zenith. Then the great arsenal and northern vanguard, Tortosa, was lost in the second crusade to the Genoese and Catalans. With the loss of both Almeria and Tortosa, Andalus had lost its two greatest eastern arsenals, including its largest port and naval headquarters, back to back. Only Denia remained.

To make things even worse, the western coast was also attacked. An allied force of English and Flemish crusaders assisted in the capture of Lisbon in 1147. While not the preeminent port on the Andalusi Atlantic (that being Silves), Lisbon was a thriving commercial center. More importantly, it functioned alongside Santarém as a strategic "lock," the loss of which surrendered Islamic control over the vital Tagus valley, and allowing the Portuguese to challenge Muslim hegemony south of Cape Espichel. Compounding the crisis, the crusaders continued their relentless advance to North Africa, seizing Oran in 1148. Meanwhile outside of Almoravid domains, the Normans were taking the entire Ifriqiyan coast.

Almeria, Tortosa, Oran, Lisbon, Minorca and the whole Ifriqiyan coast all lost simultaneously; Muslim maritime power had never looked weaker.

== List of rulers ==
Sanhaja tribal leaders recognizing the spiritual authority of Abdallah ibn Yasin (d. 1058 or 1059 (Note: Sources recount his death in 450 Hijri, and modern authors give the Gregorian date as either 1058 or 1059.)):

- Yahya Ibn Ibrahim al-Jaddali (also referred to as al-Jawhar ibn Sakkum)
- Yahya ibn Umar al-Lamtuni (d. 1055 or 1056)
- Abu Bakr ibn Umar (d. 1087)

Subsequent rulers:

- Yusuf ibn Tashfin (1061–1106, initially as Abu Bakr's lieutenant in the north)
  - Ibrahim ibn Abu Bakr (ruler of Sijilmasa, 1070–1075)
- Ali ibn Yusuf (1106–1143)
- Tashfin ibn Ali (1143–1145)
- Ibrahim ibn Tashfin (1145, dethroned quickly)
- Ishaq ibn Ali (1145–1147)

=== Family tree ===
Almoravid family tree

Turgut ibn Wartasin al-Lamtuni
Ibrahim alias Talagagin	Muhammad	Hamid
Tashfin	Ali	'Umar	al-Hajj	Tilankan
Yusuf ibn Tashfin (3)	Ibrahim	Abu Bakr ibn Tashfin	Abu Bakr ibn Umar (2)	Yahya ibn 'Umar al-Lamtuni (1)	Ali	Muhammad	Mazdali
Ali ibn Yusuf (4)	Muhammad ibn A'isha	Dawud Tamin ibn A'isha	Abū Bakr	Ibrahim	Sir	Yahya ibn A'isha	Ibrahim	Muhammad	Ali	Isa	Abu Hafs Umar	Yahya	Muhammad	Abu Bakr
Tashfin ibn Ali (5)	Ishaq ibn Ali (7)	Fatima	Yahya
Ibrahim ibn Tashfin (6)	Muhammad
