= Ibrahim ibn Tashfin =

7th Ruler of Almoravid dynasty (r. 1146–1147)

Ibrahim ibn Tashfin إبراهيم بن تاشفين

Ruler of the Almoravid dynasty
- Reign: 1146–1147
- Predecessor: Tashfin ibn Ali
- Successor: Ishaq ibn Ali
- Born: unknown date
- Died: 1147
- Dynasty: Almoravid
- Father: Tashfin ibn Ali
- Religion: Islam

Ibrahim ibn Tashfin (Arabic: إبراهيم بن تاشفين) (died 1147) was the seventh Almoravid Emir, who reigned shortly in 1146–1147. Once the news of the death of his father Tashfin ibn Ali reached Marrakesh, he was proclaimed king while still an infant. He was soon replaced by his uncle Ishaq ibn Ali, but the Almohads quickly subdued Marrakesh and killed both.

== Sources ==
- Viguera, María Jesús (1992). Los reinos de taifas y las invasiones magrebíes. MAPFRE. p. 188. ISBN 84-7100-431-3.

Preceded by Tashfin ibn Ali	Almoravid dynasty 1145–1147	Succeeded by Ishaq ibn Ali
