= Massufa =

Berber tribe

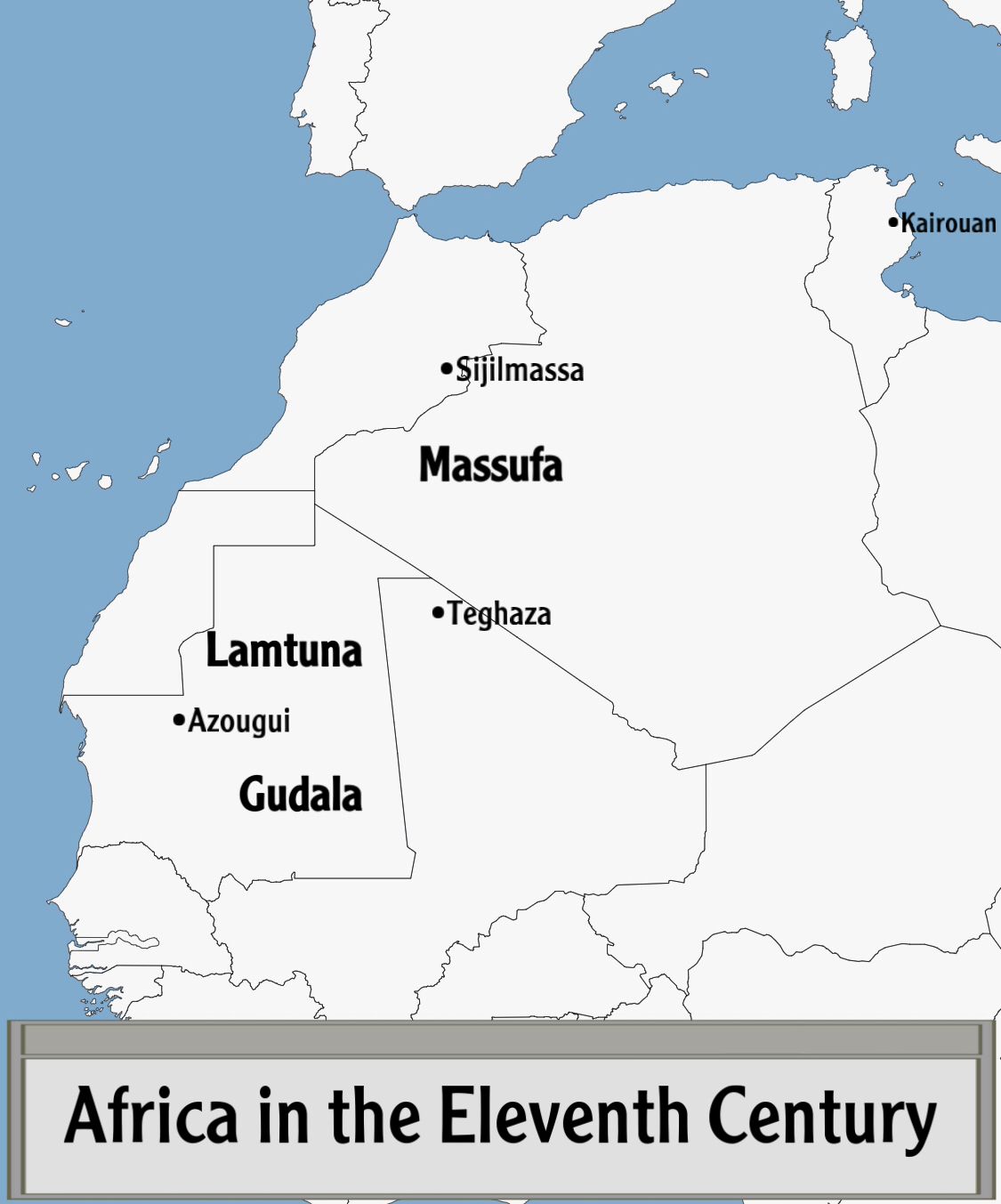
The location of the Massufa tribe in the 11th century

The Massufa are a Berber tribe whom belong to the Sanhaja. The ancestor of the Massufa, Adjana, had settled near the Chelif river in the central Maghreb. The Massufa are identifiable with the Masofi (Massufa) and their territory, known as “Bilad Massufa” (country of the Massufa) was located in the eastern region of Jebel Titteri during the Severan era (3rd century AD). This important tribal confederation were ruled by the Talkata branch, that of the Zirids in the 10th century.

A number of Berber tribes fled southward during the Arab invasion. The Massufa are listed among the Sanhaja tribes who were displaced from the north. Ibn Khaldun commented on these tribes and stated that the Sanhaja are indigenous people of the region and placed the kings of the Lamtuna and Massufa in the meeting of the middle Maghreb, he also mentioned that the Massufa were present in the Gourara.

The Banu Ghaniya, a dynasty that ruled in the Balearic Islands and then in Ifriqiya were Massufa in origin.
