= Tashfin ibn Ali =

6th Ruler of Almoravid dynasty (r. 1143–1145)

Tashfin II

Ruler of the Almoravid dynasty
- Reign: 1143–1145
- Predecessor: Ali ibn Yusuf
- Successor: Ibrahim ibn Tashfin
- Born: unknown date
- Died: 23/25 March 1145
- Dynasty: Almoravid
- Father: Ali ibn Yusuf
- Religion: Islam

Tashfin ibn Ali (died 23 March 1145, or 25 March 1145 CE; Arabic : تاشفين بن علي ) was the 6th Almoravid Emir, he reigned in 1143–1145.

== Biography ==
Tashfin ibn Ali was appointed Governor of Granada and Almería in 1129, as well as of Córdoba in 1131, during the reign of his father Ali ibn Yusuf.

He was the supreme governor of Al Andalus from 1126 to 1137 and would in these years, lead the Almoravids to some notable victories (Aceca in 1130, Fraga in 1134, Badajoz in 1134, Escalona 1137) but he also suffered some losses therein. From 1138, the year after his departure to Morocco, the impetus was on the side of the Christians and the Muslims suffered major losses in raids and the capture of important fortresses (Oreja in 1139, Coria in 1142). This was in part due to the renewed offensive of the Almohads in Morocco.

He succeeded his father in 1143. In 1145, he went to fight the Almohads, under the leadership of Abd al-Mu'min, in the Oran area. He was besieged for several days by the Almohad forces and finally opted for escaping by sea. He subsequently called on a fleet from Almeria, burned his military encampment and while trying to join the port by night on horseback, he fell off a cliff in the Atlas Mountains and died in March 1145. He was succeeded first by his son Ibrahim ibn Tashfin, who was still an infant, and soon after by his brother Ishaq ibn Ali.

Preceded by Ali ibn Yusuf	Almoravids; 1143–1145	Succeeded by Ibrahim ibn Tashfin
