= Ishaq ibn Ali =

Almoravid Emir (ruled 1147; died 1147)

Ishaq ibn Ali إسحق بن علي

Ruler of the Almoravid dynasty
- Reign: 1147
- Predecessor: Ibrahim ibn Tashfin
- Born: unknown date
- Died: April 1147
- Dynasty: Almoravid
- Father: Ali ibn Yusuf
- Religion: Islam

Ishaq ibn Ali (Arabic: إسحق بن علي) (died April 1147) was the 8th and last Almoravid Emir who reigned shortly in 1147.

Ishaq was the uncle of his predecessor as emir, Ibrahim ibn Tashfin, and was killed after the conquest of Marrakesh by the Almohads. Due to repeated attacks by the Almohads, Ishaq ibn Ali had to flee to the Atlas Mountains where he took refuge in the High Atlas. After the situation calmed down, he returned to Marrakesh taking control once again however, the Almohads conquered the city, killing both Ibrahim and Ishaq and establishing the Almohad Caliphate.

== Sources ==
- Viguera, María Jesús (1992). Los reinos de taifas y las invasiones magrebíes. MAPFRE. p. 188. ISBN 84-7100-431-3.

Preceded by Ibrahim ibn Tashfin	Almoravid dynasty 1147	Succeeded by Overthrown by the Almohads
